= CarVertical =

Lithuanian information technology company

CV Group, UAB
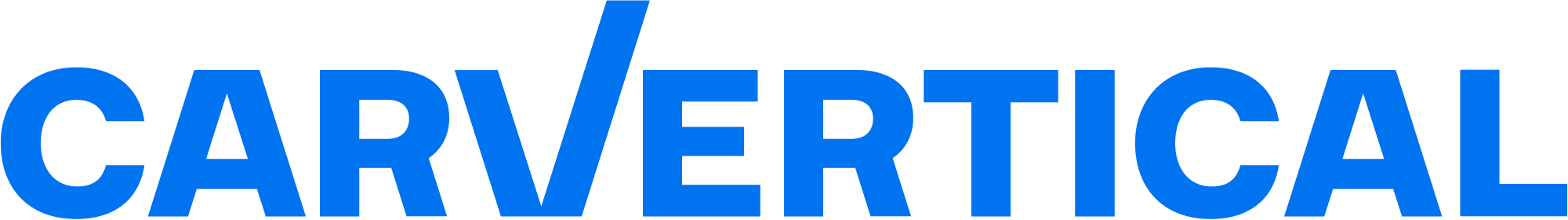
- Trade name: carVertical
- Type: Private limited company
- Industry: Information technology
- Founded: 2017
- Key people: Rokas Medonis (CEO)
- Services: Vehicle history checks
- Revenue: €75 833 669 (2025)
- Number of employees: 156 (2026)
- Website: www.carvertical.com

Carvertical (stylized carVertical) is a Lithuanian information technology company that provides vehicle history reports. Founded in 2017, it operates in multiple regions through a website and mobile apps.

== How it works ==
Users request a report by entering a vehicle identification number (VIN) on carVertical’s platform. The company aggregates available records from public and commercial databases, such as registration, ownership, insurance, and governmental roadworthiness test data. Then generates a vehicle history report. The scope of information in a report depends on the data held by the contributing sources in each country.

== Information sourcing ==
Listed as an approved NMVTIS (National Motor Vehicle Title Information System) data provider by the U.S. Department of Justice. NMVTIS receives title, brand, and odometer records from U.S. state motor-vehicle titling agencies. It also includes salvage and total-loss information reported by insurance carriers and by junk, salvage, and auto-recycling yards that handle salvage vehicles. Consumer NMVTIS reports typically show current title status, brand history, the most recent odometer reading, and, where available, theft data. NMVTIS does not include full repair histories.

According to CITA (International Motor Vehicle Inspection Committee), the company provides vehicle history reports in 28 countries, with coverage extending across most of Europe, the United States, Mexico, and Australia. As an NMVTIS data provider, its U.S. reports draw on participating state motor-vehicle titling agencies and cover vehicles such as passenger cars, buses, trucks, motorcycles, recreational vehicles, motor homes, and tractors.

=== Information sourcing disputes ===
In June 2023, the Lithuanian Court of Appeal partly upheld a claim by Diginet LTU, the operator of Autoplius.lt, against carVertical. The court found that data from the Autoplius.lt classifieds database had been extracted and reused without authorization. It ordered the company to stop using those data in its reports and to delete previously obtained records. The court also awarded compensation of 1000 units of the minimum living standards (about €42 000 at the time) and litigation costs.

In February 2024, the Supreme Court of Lithuania annulled the 2023 judgments and returned the case to the court of first instance for reconsideration. On retrial, the Vilnius Regional Court dismissed Diginet LTU's claim in February 2025. In June 2025, the Lithuanian Court of Appeal upheld the dismissal and ordered Diginet LTU to reimburse CV Group for part of its legal costs.

== History ==
- 2017 – The company was founded in Lithuania.
- 2018 – Raised €16 million in funding.
- 2018 – Launched vehicle history reports in Estonia and Lithuania.
- 2018 – Joined the MOBI initiative on blockchain use in the automotive industry.
- 2019 – Entered its first market outside Europe by launching reports in the United States.
- 2020 – Announced that annual revenue had quadrupled. The company then operated in 23 countries across Europe, North America, and Asia.
- 2021 – In March, the United Kingdom became the company's 25th market.
- 2023 – The company rebranded and updated its visual identity.
- 2023 – Ranked 26th in the Financial Times FT1000 list.
- 2023 – Won the LRT "Business Leadership of the Year" award.
- 2024 – Ranked 200th in the Financial Times FT1000 list.

== See also ==
- Carfax
- HPI Check
- VINCheck
- National Motor Vehicle Title Information System
- Odometer fraud
- Used car
- Vehicle history report
- Vehicle identification number
