= Total loss =

Situation where a damaged property's salvage or repair cost exceeds its insured value

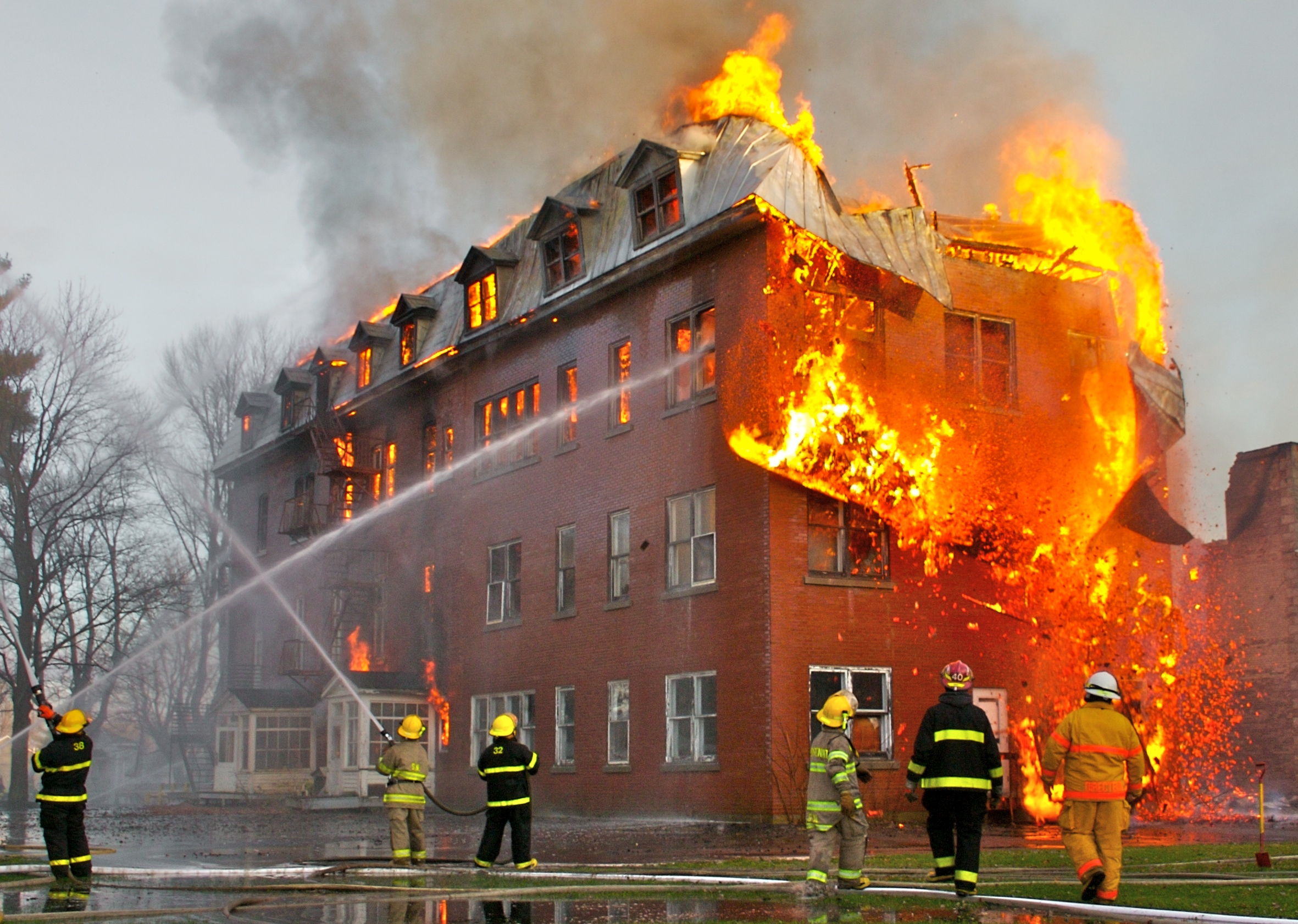
This building will be a "total loss" if its insurer determines that the cost of repairing it exceeds that of its insured value.

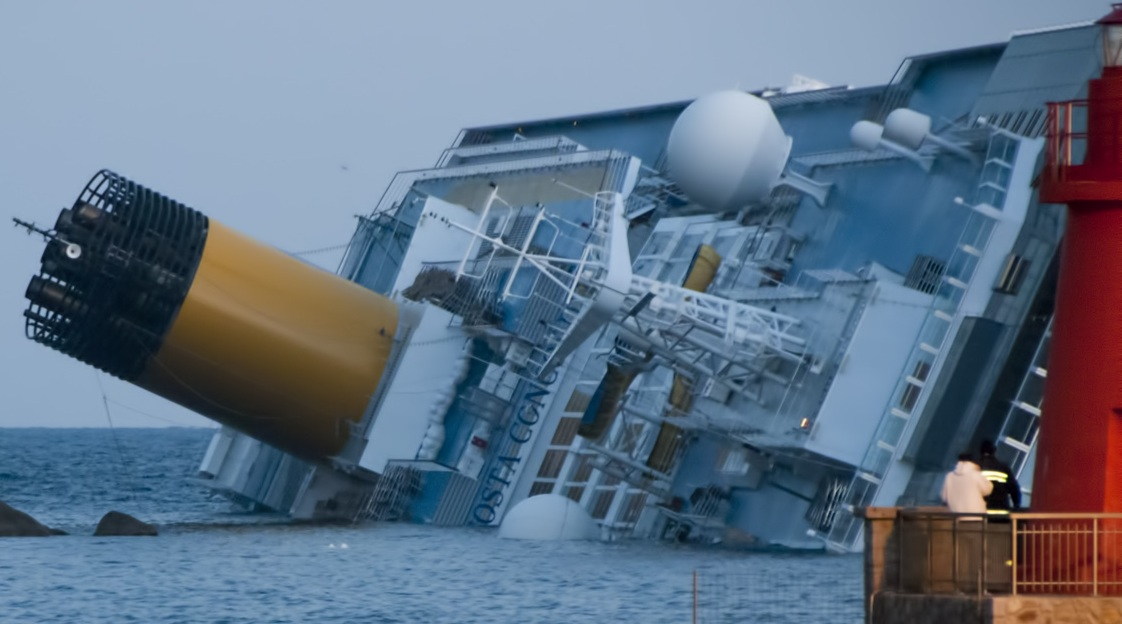
Even though only partly sunk in shallow water, in 2012 the relatively new cruise liner Costa Concordia was declared a "constructive total loss" due to escalating environmental and salvage clean-up costs.

In insurance claims, a total loss or write-off is a situation where the lost value, repair cost or salvage cost of a damaged property exceeds its insured value, and simply replacing the old property with a new equivalent is more cost-effective.

Such a loss may be an "actual total loss" or a "constructive total loss". Constructive total loss considers further incidental expenses beyond repair, such as force majeure.

== General principles ==
In a total loss, the insurer must indemnify the assured in full, and ownership of the insured item thereby passes to the insurer under the legal process of "subrogation". Although the policy determines the level at which the loss becomes total rather than partial, nevertheless the assured (and not the insurer) has the final say as to whether he wishes to make a partial or total claim.

If the insured item is, say, a car or a house, the policy will normally give it a "market value" which may be less than the assured had in mind; any disagreement would need to be challenged, perhaps using arbitration. In marine insurance, policies may be valued (where the value of the ship or cargo is agreed) or unvalued (where a market value at the time of the claim would need to be ascertained). In the absence of fraud, the Marine Insurance Act 1906 states the agreed value in a valued policy is conclusive, except in cases of constructive total loss, as in the cases of the cruise ship Costa Concordia and the ship The Bamburi.

Written off properties are usually demolished or torn down, scrapped, or recycled for parts after their policies are settled; so the insurer may be relieved not to have the insured item subrogated to him, as in Asfar v Blundell [1896].

Policies covering homes, vehicles, and other non-investment assets subject to depreciation may indemnify the insured to much less than the full replacement cost, so that the insured items may become "total losses" despite some residual value.

== Actual vs constructive loss ==
An actual total loss of a vessel occurs when repair is physically or legally impossible. A total loss may be presumed when a ship disappears and no news is received within a reasonable time. Some legal authorities do not consider it an actual total loss if repair costs are merely prohibitive, while others include cases where the cost of repair would exceed the cost of the vessel. In any case, the term "legally impossible" covers instances where reconstruction would be so extensive that the resulting craft would be legally considered a new vessel.

A constructive total loss is a situation where the cost of repairs plus the cost of salvage equal or exceed the value of the vessel. It also covers cases where the vessel has been abandoned in the reasonable belief that a total loss is inevitable. The calculation can be affected by environmental cleanup costs.

== By insurance industry ==
=== Auto insurance ===
Much of this section only relates to the insurance industry in North America. Other jurisdictions, for example Australia, have their own regulations. About one in seven car accident claims results in a "total". Except in extreme circumstances, a vehicle that has been written off will not be completely worthless. This is because such a vehicle will usually still contain salvageable used parts, or at a bare minimum will still have value as scrap metal. All that is required for a vehicle to be a write-off is that it would cost more to return to marketable condition than the market value it would then have. So a vehicle of low value may even be written off when fully roadworthy, for example due to damage to paintwork or upholstery, such as from an interior fire, a "hail salvage", or bullet-riddled or "biohazard car" with toxic chemical spills or decomposing bodies found inside.

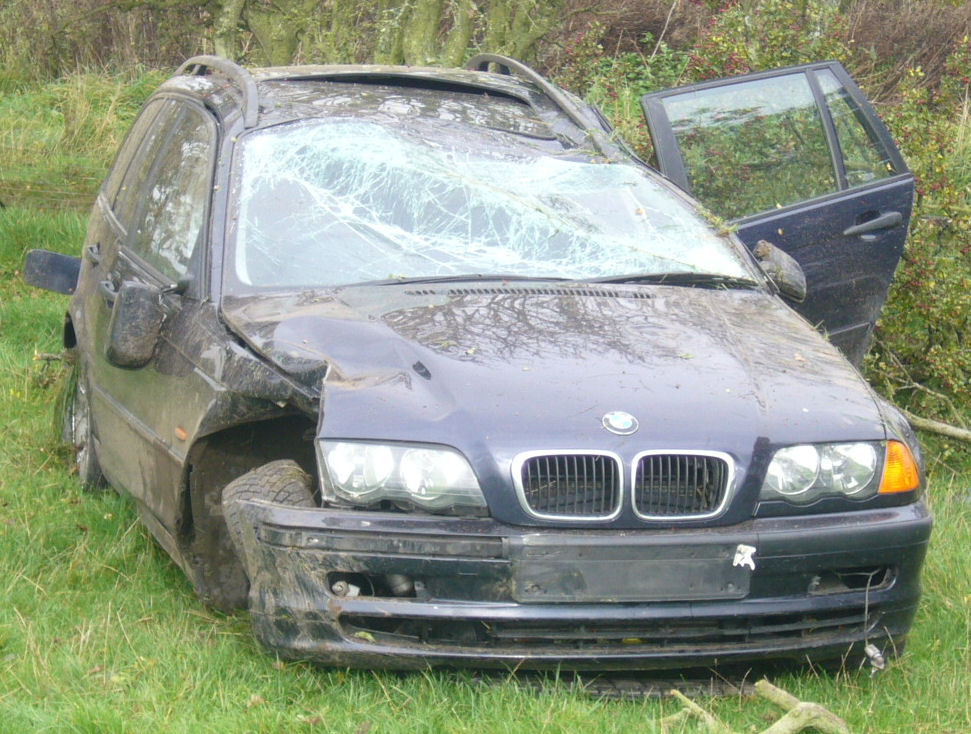
A severely damaged automobile with repair costs greatly exceeding its value

In many jurisdictions a vehicle designated as a total loss is sold by insurance companies to general public, auto dealers, auto brokers, or auto wreckers. The metrics insurance companies use to make the decision include the cost of the repairs needed plus the value of the remaining parts, added to the cost of reimbursing the driver for a rental while the car in question is repaired. If this figure exceeds the value of the car after it is repaired, the vehicle is deemed a total loss. Auto insurers generally settle total loss claims on one of three methods of claim settlement:

1. Actual Cash Value (or ACV): the value of the vehicle is determined by the claims adjuster after the total loss occurs,
2. Agreed Value: the vehicle value is determined prior to the start of the policy period), or
3. Stated Value: a hybrid method where the insurer has the option to pay the vehicle limit listed on the policy declarations page or Actual Cash Value (whichever is less).

In most jurisdictions, a decision by an insurer to write off a vehicle results in vehicle title branding, marking the car as "salvage" or (if repaired and reinspected under subsequent ownership) "rebuilt".

If the vehicle is not severely damaged, however, it can be restored to its original condition. After a government approved inspection, the vehicle can be put back on the road. The inspection process may not attempt to assess the quality of the repairs. This function will be relegated to a professional mechanic or inspector. However, if the vehicle is severely damaged as per standards set by state or provincial governments, the vehicle is dismantled by an auto wrecker and is sold as parts or scrapped.

Once a vehicle has been written off and repaired the vehicle may still lose value. Diminished value is the reduction in a vehicle's market value occurring after a vehicle is wrecked and repaired, otherwise called accelerated depreciation. To collect diminished value after a car accident, insurance companies usually ask for a diminished value report.

In Canada, this is more commonly called accelerated depreciation; how a person goes about reclaiming those losses in either country is a different process. In some US states, insurance companies acknowledge diminished value and provide this coverage direct to their consumers. In Canada, in order to recuperate the lost value after an accident, a person needs to retain legal counsel and order an acceleration depreciation report on their car for the court's use.

=== United Kingdom market trends ===
In the UK market, the frequency of vehicles declared a constructive total loss increased significantly between 2019 and 2025.

Analysis from the accident management sector attributed this trend to a 25% rise in average repair costs, driven by inflationary pressure on parts and labor, as well as the complexity of repairing ADAS-equipped vehicles.

Consequently, insurers frequently designate repairable vehicles as total losses (specifically Category S or N) because the cost of remedial work exceeds the vehicle's residual value. This creates a financial shortfall between the insurance settlement and the vehicle's replacement cost, increasing consumer reliance on GAP insurance policies.

=== Shipping ===
In marine insurance, conventional marine insurers such as Lloyds will issue policies covering hull & machinery, or cargo, whereas P&I clubs cover third-party risks (such as a carrier's damage to cargo), pollution risks, and war risks. The term "total loss" can refer to any of these risks, but commonly involves a loss of the hull or cargo. Total losses may be actual total loss or constructive.

If the policy is a "valued" policy (so that the ship or cargo has an "agreed value" rather than a "market value"), then, in the absence of fraud, the agreed value is conclusive, but only for an actual total loss. In a constructive total loss, the agreed value is not conclusive.

=== Aviation ===
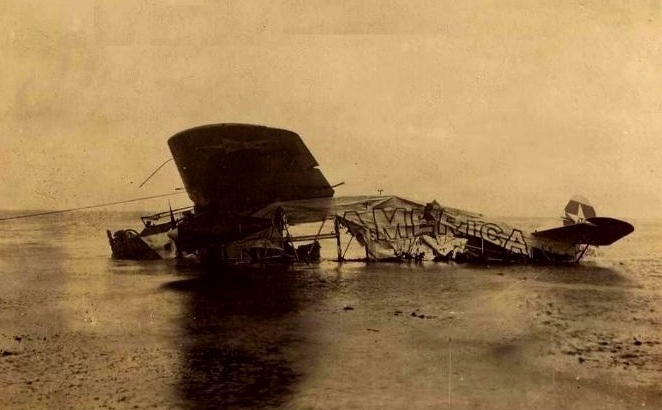
Richard Byrd's Fokker America was completely written off after its forced ditching in the Atlantic in June 1927. Byrd and three others survived. The original destination Paris was socked in by fog making a landing impossible at LeBourget. Souvenir hunters stripped the aircraft of its fabric skin and other components.

In aviation, the term "hull loss" is used in aviation accidents that damage the aircraft beyond economical repair, resulting in a total loss. The term also applies to situations when the aircraft is missing, the search for its wreckage is terminated, or when the wreckage is completely inaccessible.

== See also ==
- Lemon (automobile)
- Vehicle title branding
- Vehicle insurance
- Accident management
