= Salvage title =

Title indicating a damaged or written off vehicle

In North America, a salvage title is a form of vehicle title branding, which notes that the vehicle has been damaged and/or deemed a total loss by an insurance company that paid a claim on it. The criteria for determining when a salvage title is issued differ considerably by each state, province or territory. In a minority of states and Canadian provinces, regulations require a salvage title for stolen or vandalized vehicles which are not recovered by police within 21 days. In such cases insurance companies declare a vehicle total loss and pay off the previous owner; but, in others, it is issued only for losses due to damage. Under some circumstances, a salvage title denotation may be removed or replaced with a Rebuilt Salvage designation; and cars imported to, or exported from, the United States may be issued a clean title regardless of history.

Because a salvage title can be issued to a vehicle with easily repairable problems or no damage whatsoever, the low cost of the salvaged motorcycle or car is appealing to some hobbyists and investors. Experts recommend caution when purchasing a salvaged vehicle, because there may be hidden damage, which, if unrepairable, may render the vehicle a "pile of parts."

A junk title is a different classification for cars that can only be used for parts or scrap, and are not to be repaired to road-worthy conditions.

== Determination of salvage status ==
In general, a vehicle is deemed to be "salvage" when the insurer determines that the repair or replacement cost is in excess of approximately 70% of its market value at the time of the accident or theft. Thresholds range between 50% and 95% of the vehicle's value, while "total loss states" leave the specifics to the insurer. In the state of Michigan, the issuance of a salvage title does not mean that the vehicle is also deemed a total loss. Michigan issues a salvage title when the damage equals 75-90% of the pre-damage value; if the loss is 91% or greater the vehicle is eligible only for a "scrap" title, which cannot be subsequently upgraded by any means. In Oregon, a vehicle is given a salvage title when, due to damage, it has lost 70% or more of its value, or if it was abandoned and is worth less than $500.

Upon paying the claim, the insurer may offer to return the vehicle to the owner as an insurance buy-back, in which case the owner is responsible for having the repairs made and having the car inspected by a state-designated facility. Depending on the state, this inspection may remove the salvage brand from the vehicle's title. The exact percentage of value that triggers the decision to total the vehicle is guided by applicable laws and regulations. The damage estimate is calculated at retail repair rates, which may be more than the cost of wholesale repair. Vehicles that are not bought back are auctioned as salvage to an auto recycler or a rebuilder and given a salvage title.

== Resale value with a salvage title ==
In the US, motorcycles and cars which carry a salvage title may not be registered and driven on public roads in most states, which affects resale value. While selling a salvage car is not against the law, the seller must disclose to the buyer that the vehicle has a salvage title. Rebranding of the title is not permitted without having an inspection to verify that they meet all safety standards. The inspection procedure may be complex, and attempts to illegally circumvent the inspections are periodically reported.

Industry standards followed by the National Automobile Dealers Association Appraisal Guides, Kelley Blue Book Market Report Official Guide, and the International Society of Automotive Appraisers devalue a motor vehicle that has a salvage title. The Kelley Blue Book automatically rates any salvage vehicle as "poor" and does not value it at all. The value of a vehicle with a salvage title is generally 65-75% lower than the vehicle's estimated value.

If the vehicle is rebuilt to a road worthy condition and has passed State inspection, the difference in price is 60-70% of "fair" KBB. These cars have "rebuild" or "rebuild salvage" annotation in the title and can be registered and operated just like a car with a clean title.

Cars that previously had "junk" title and were restored to road worthy condition get a new title and VIN after state inspection. The new VIN will not match any other VIN numbers on the vehicle doors or panels. Year of the vehicle is determined by title issue date. These are considered to be self assembled cars.

=== Title washing ===
Title washing refers to transferring a vehicle's registration for the express purpose of removing a title brand. The practice is legal, and practiced by the insurance companies themselves. Title brands such as "salvage," "junk," and "rebuilt" are not standardized, and a vehicle which has such a designation may receive a clean title when registered in a different jurisdiction. Further, vehicles imported to or exported from the United States and Canada are issued a clean title, even if they have been involved in an accident. Other states have relatively lax inspection criteria to remove the salvage brand.

=== Crime ===
In 2025, Europol announced a major crackdown of an international car-cloning network that bought wrecked cars auctioned for scrap in the United States. A scheme based on "sham companies and fake invoices" was used to conceal their histories. They were then shipped to Europe to be repaired in Lithuania and finally imported to other European Union countries by regular car dealers. The damage, on top of the security risks posed to the users of the improperly repaired vehicles, was estimated to be €31 million of unpaid VAT and custom duties.

== Vehicle history reports ==
Vehicle history reports sold by specialty services are intended to disclose the title history of the vehicle, including title washing. Because many US states don't submit accident information to the central National Motor Vehicle Title Information System and junkyards don't always file required paperwork for destroyed vehicles, the accuracy of these reports is not high. Consumer Reports noted that vehicle history checks would at times produce "clean" results despite the vehicles' being offered for sale as damaged on salvage-vehicle resale websites; title report provider Carfax settled a class-action lawsuit regarding the comprehensiveness of its reports in 2007.
