= Accelerated depreciation =

Accounting method

Accelerated depreciation refers to any one of several methods by which a company, for 'financial accounting' or tax purposes, depreciates a fixed asset in such a way that the amount of depreciation taken each year is higher during the earlier years of an asset's life. For financial accounting purposes, accelerated depreciation is expected to be much more productive during its early years, so that depreciation expense will more accurately represent how much of an asset's usefulness is being used up each year. For tax purposes, accelerated depreciation provides a way of deferring corporate income taxes by reducing taxable income in current years, in exchange for increased taxable income in future years. This is a valuable tax incentive that encourages businesses to purchase new assets.

For financial reporting purposes, the two most popular methods of accelerated depreciation are the double declining balance method and the sum-of-the-years’ digits method. For tax purposes, the allowable methods of accelerated depreciation depend on the tax law that the taxpayer is subject to. In the United States, the two currently allowable depreciation methods for tax purposes are both accelerated depreciation methods (ACRS and MACRS).

== Background ==
Companies in many countries pay taxes on profits: revenues minus expenses. There are various types of expenses, including salaries paid to workers, cost of inputs, and amortization (tax law) and depreciation. Profits for tax purposes will, in most countries, differ from accounting profits or earnings.

Under both financial accounting and tax accounting, companies are not allowed to claim the entire cost of a capital asset (any asset which can be used for many years) as an expense immediately. They must amortize the cost of the asset over some period, usually an approximation of the useful life of the asset. The depreciation basis is the cost incurred by the company in acquiring the asset. The useful life of the asset is determined by looking at Section 168(e)(3) of the United States Tax Code, and is known as the class life of the property. An example would be that a railroad track has a useful life of 7 years. This is not the end of the analysis however, because then it becomes necessary to look at the applicable recovery period of the property. The applicable recovery period determines the number of years over which the property should be depreciated. Section 168(e)(1) provides a table for determining the applicable recovery period. Following our 7 year railroad track, the table states that property with a useful life of more than 4 years but less than 10 years will be treated as 5 year property. Finally, it is important to determine the applicable convention for depreciation. Section 168(d)(4) of the U.S. Tax Code gives three different types: half year convention, the mid-month convention, and the midquarter convention. Conventions determine how much of the depreciation deduction the taxpayer may take the first year. This prevents taxpayers from claiming a full year's deduction when the asset has only been in service for part of the year.

Governments generally provide opportunities to defer taxes where there are specific policy reasons to encourage an industry. For example, accelerated depreciation is used in some countries to encourage investment in renewable energy. Further, governments have increased accelerated depreciation methods in time of economic stress (in particular, the US government passed laws after 9–11 to further accelerate depreciation on capital assets).

== Example ==
As a simple example, a company buys a generator that costs $1,000 that is expected to last for 10 years. Under straight-line depreciation, the most simple form of depreciation, the company allocates $100 of the cost of the generator to its expenses every year, until the $1,000 capital expense has been "used up." Under accelerated depreciation, the company may be allowed to allocate $200 of the cost of the generator for five years.

If the company has $200 in profits per year (before consideration of the cost of the generator or any effects of debt or other factors), and the tax rate is 20%:

a) Normal depreciation: the company claims $100 in depreciation every year and has a tax profit of $100; it must pay tax of $20 on the $100 gain. Over ten years, $200 in taxes are paid.

b) Accelerated depreciation: the company claims $200 in depreciation for the first five years, and nothing for the last five years. For the first five years, it has no taxable profit and pays no gains tax. For the last five years, the company has a gain of $200, and pays $40 per year in tax, for a total of $200.

To compare these two (simplified) cases, the company pays $200 in taxes in both instances. In the second case, it has deferred taxes to a much later period. The deferral of taxes to a later period is favorable according to the time value of money principle.

(This example has been simplified for a basic demonstration of how accelerated depreciation works. It does not factor in an accurate class life, recovery period or account for convention.)

== See also ==
- Depreciation
- MACRS
- Diminished value
- Accelerated Depreciation (Automotive)
