= R.L. Polk & Company =

Data publishing company

- Type: Data publishing
- Industry: Automotive
- Founded: 1870; 156 years ago Detroit, Michigan, U.S.
- Founder: Ralph Lane Polk
- Fate: Acquired by IHS Markit
- Headquarters: Southfield, Michigan, U.S.
- Area served: Worldwide
- Key people: Stephen R. Polk: Chairman, President and CEO; Tim Rogers: President, Polk; Richard Raines: President, CARFAX; Michelle Goff: Senior Vice President/Chief Financial Officer
- Website: www.polk.com

R. L. Polk & Company was a provider of business and marketing information to the automotive industry, insurance companies, and related businesses. It was based in Southfield, Michigan with operations in several other countries, including Canada, Germany, the United Kingdom, France, Japan, China and Australia. Its business-to-business marketing services included PolkInsight, the National Vehicle Population Profile (NVPP), Blackburn / Polk Marketing Services Inc. (BPMSI), Polk Dealer Marketing Manager, The Ultimate Perspective (T.U.P), Polk Canada Net, Polk Vehicle Lifecycle System, Polk CrossSell Reports, and Polk Total Market Predictor (Polk TMP). From 1999, it was the owner of the vehicle data service Carfax.

Polk was acquired by IHS Markit in 2013, which was acquired by S&P Global in 2022.

== Company history ==
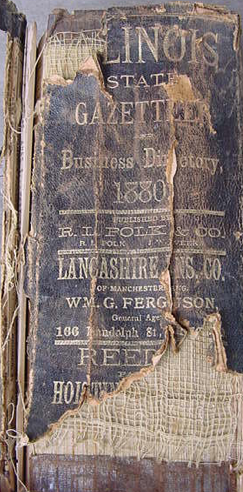
Polk's Illinois State Gazetteer, 1880

R. L. Polk & Company was founded by Ralph Lane Polk in 1870 in Detroit as a publisher of business directories. In 1872, the company first published a directory with names and addresses of all residents of Evansville, Indiana, plus a listing of post offices in nine states. Additional directories followed in the ensuing years. claiming 1000 directories by 1960. Affiliates included the Polk-Husted Directory Co. of Oakland, California. Polk directories contain an alphabetical listing of residents and businesses in a city. They usually also contain a section with properties listed in consecutive order by address. In addition to city directories, the company published bank directories.

In 1907, R.L. Polk & Co. was publishing a Gazetteer Business directory for the states of Michigan (plus Windsor and Walkerville, Ontario), Alaska, Arkansas, California, Idaho, Illinois, Oklahoma, Indiana, Iowa, Kansas, Kentucky, Maryland, Minnesota, North Dakota, South Dakota, Montana, Missouri, Nevada, Oregon, Washington, Pennsylvania, Tennessee, Texas, Utah, West Virginia and Wisconsin.

In 1921, a conversation between Ralph Lane Polk II and Alfred P. Sloan (who later became president of General Motors) helped fuel R. L. Polk & Company's entry into the automotive industry. During the conversation, Sloan asked Polk to impartially tabulate and publish statistical information on cars and trucks in operation. R.L. Polk & Company launched its motor vehicle statistical operations in 1922, when the first car registration reports were published. In 1922, R.L. Polk & Co. published its first Passenger Car Registration Report, covering 58 makes and accounting for 9.2 million passenger automobiles on America's highways.

From 1951 to 1958, the company pioneered the use of electronic punch card tabulating equipment. In 1956, Polk's reporting services included monthly statistics on boats, business aircraft, motorcycles, commercial trailers, and recreational vehicles. In 1976, the National Vehicle Population Profile (NVPP) was introduced.

=== Turn of the century growth and sale ===
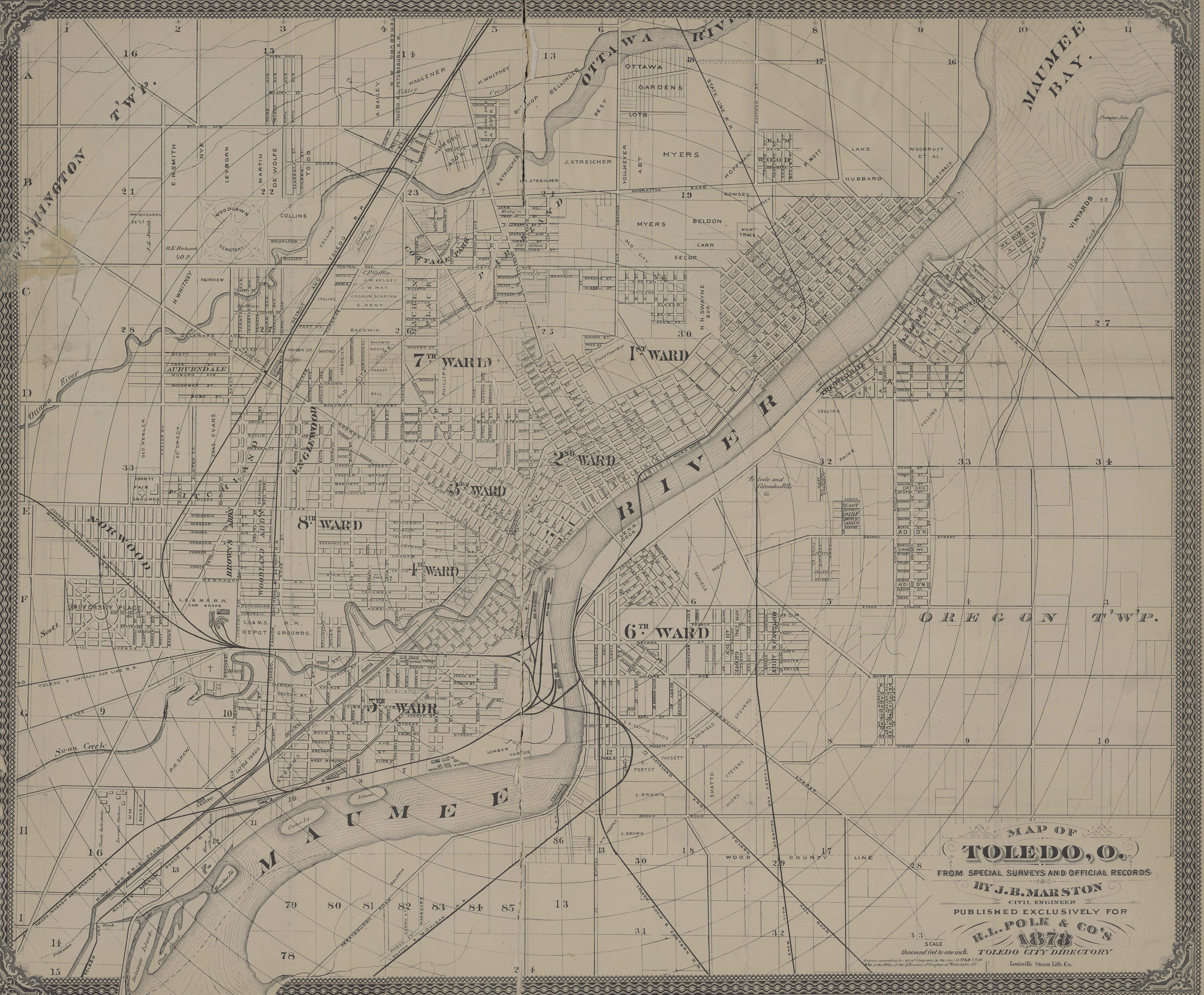
A 1878 R. L. Polk & Company map of Toledo, Ohio

In 1993, Polk combined their Canadian activities with Blackburn Marketing Services to form Blackburn/Polk Marketing Services Inc. (BPMSI). Polk also acquired a 35% interest in Carfax from Blackburn Marketing Services. In 1995, Polk entered an alliance with Marketing Systems GmBH and acquired a substantial minority interest in The Ultimate Perspective (T.U.P).

In 1996, Polk completed acquisition of the Blackburn/Polk operations and renamed it Polk Canada Marketing Services Inc. (PCMSI). In 1997, Polk acquired the MSS division of Automatic Data Processing's European operations. In 1999, Polk sold Advertising Unlimited, Inc. to Norwood Promotional Products.

The Polk Company announced on August 2, 1999 that it had completed a 100% acquisition of Carfax. Polk had previously owned 35 percent of Carfax, in partnership with the Blackburn Group, Inc. of London, Ontario. Carfax compiles vehicle histories from various sources, with about 75 percent of the information coming from Polk data. Using the vehicle identification number (VIN), each history provides potential buyers with all available facts about a used car being considered for purchase. This may include original use of the vehicle, odometer records, number of owners, and other items that might affect a purchase decision.

In 2000, Polk sold its Consumer Information Solutions (CIS) business units, including Direct Marketing, Data Information Services/Polk Verity, City Directory, and the Compusearch and Prospects Unlimited units of Polk Canada, to Equifax. Polk launched Garage Predictors and Polk Canada, Inc. announced Polk Canada Net. Polk acquired Marketing Systems Group.

Ralph Lane Polk II was inducted into the Automotive Hall of Fame in Dearborn, Michigan in 2001, and into The Direct Marketing Association (DMA) Hall of Fame in 2002.

In 2005, R. L. Polk & Company introduced the Polk Inventory Efficiency Award, which recognizes and rewards outstanding aftermarket companies for process improvements relative to inventory efficiency. In 2007, R. L. Polk & Co. acquired a majority interest in ROADTODATA, a supplier of automotive price and specifications data. In 2010, R. L. Polk & Company partnered with Citytwist.

In 2013, IHS Markit announced a $1.4 billion purchase of R.L. Polk, saying that Polk's automotive information services were complementary and would open up additional markets for IHS. IHS assumed control of R.L. Polk's two divisions, Polk and Carfax. In 2020, IHS was purchased by S&P Global for about $44 billion.

== See also ==
- City directory
- St. Louis City Directories
- New York City Directories
