= Acko Insurance =

Insurance Company In India

- Industry: Insurance
- Founded: 2016
- Headquarters: Bengaluru, Karnataka, India
- Area served: India
- Key people: Varun Dua
- Products: Motor insurance Health insurance Travel insurance Term life insurance In-trip domestic insurance Mobile insurance
- Services: Traffic challan check & payment FASTag recharge ABHA ID creation Car servicing Car valuation
- Parent: Acko Technology and Services Private Limited
- Website: acko.com

Acko Insurance is an Indian private sector general insurance company headquartered in Bengaluru. Founded in November 2016, the company received its license from the Insurance Regulatory and Development Authority of India (IRDAI) in September 2017. Acko follows an online-led model and hence all operations for the company are offered through the digital platform.

== History ==
Acko General Insurance was founded by Varun Dua, is the chief executive officer. As of 2018, Acko has raised ₹2.74 billion ($42 million) in funding from investors such as Amazon, Accel Partners, SAIF Partners, Catamaran Ventures. The retail products offered by Acko General Insurance include motor insurance, health insurance, travel insurance, in-trip domestic insurance and mobile insurance for smartphones. Acko Insurance also offers term life insurance through its life insurance subsidiary.

Acko also provides several app-based value-added services, including traffic challan checking and payment, FASTag recharge, Ayushman Bharat Health Account (ABHA) ID creation, car servicing through Acko Drive service centres, and online used-car valuation tools.

In October 2021, the company secured its position as India's 34th unicorn by raising $255 million through a Series D funding round.

In 2022, Acko General Insurance reached ₹1000 crore in annual revenue.

India's insurance watchdog, IRDAI (Insurance Regulatory and Development Authority), recently fined general insurer Acko Rs 10 million for multiple regulatory lapses in its outsourcing and commission practices.

In January 2025, ACKO unveiled a refreshed brand identity and a redesigned logo inspired by the Möbius strip.

== Acko Drive ==
Acko Drive was introduced in 2019 as part of the company's expansion into automotive services, initially collaborating with car dealerships in Bengaluru. By 2024, the platform was operational in 12 Indian cities, including Delhi NCR, Mumbai, and Chennai.

In 2022, Acko Drive began facilitating online car purchases and financing options through partnerships with banks and non-banking financial institutions. Maintenance and repair services were later added, with two service centers operating in Bengaluru as of 2024. The company has also collaborated with used-car platforms Zoomcar, Spinny and Cars24.

== Funding ==
In August 2026, the Competition Commission of India (CCI) approved the acquisition of an additional stake in parent entity Acko Technology & Services by General Atlantic via a rights issue, increasing its total shareholding beyond 25%.
