= Vintage car =

Cars made between 1919 and 1925 or 1930

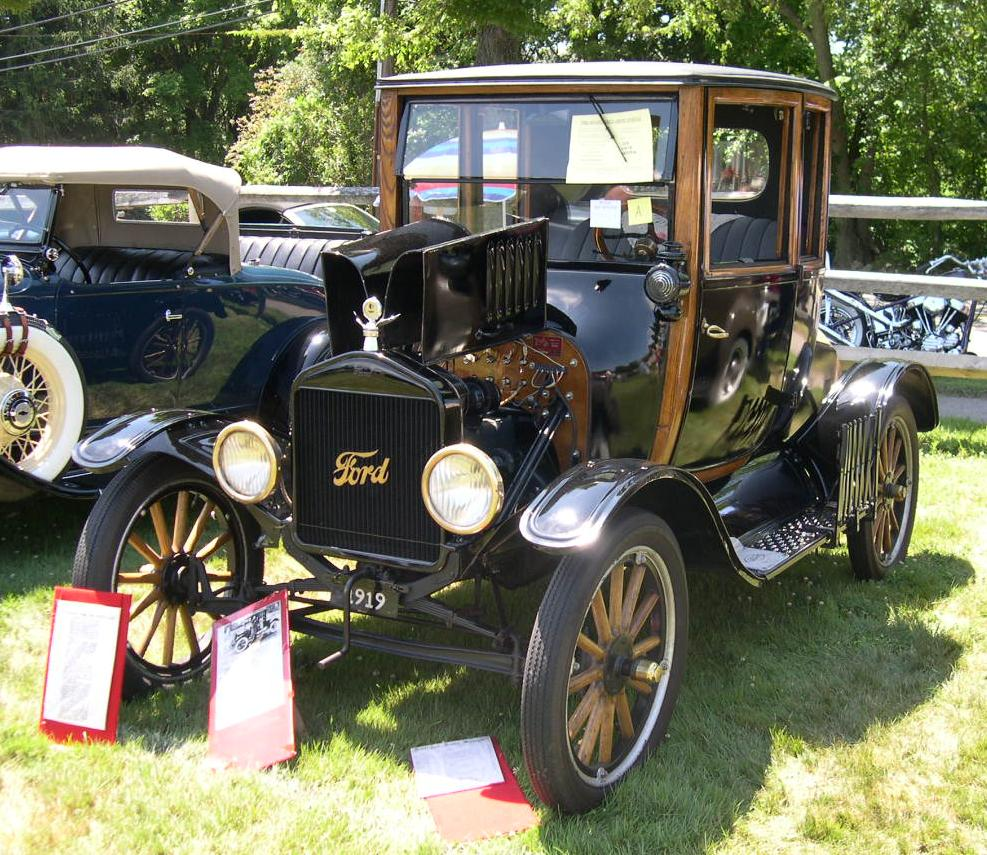
1919 Ford Model T coupe

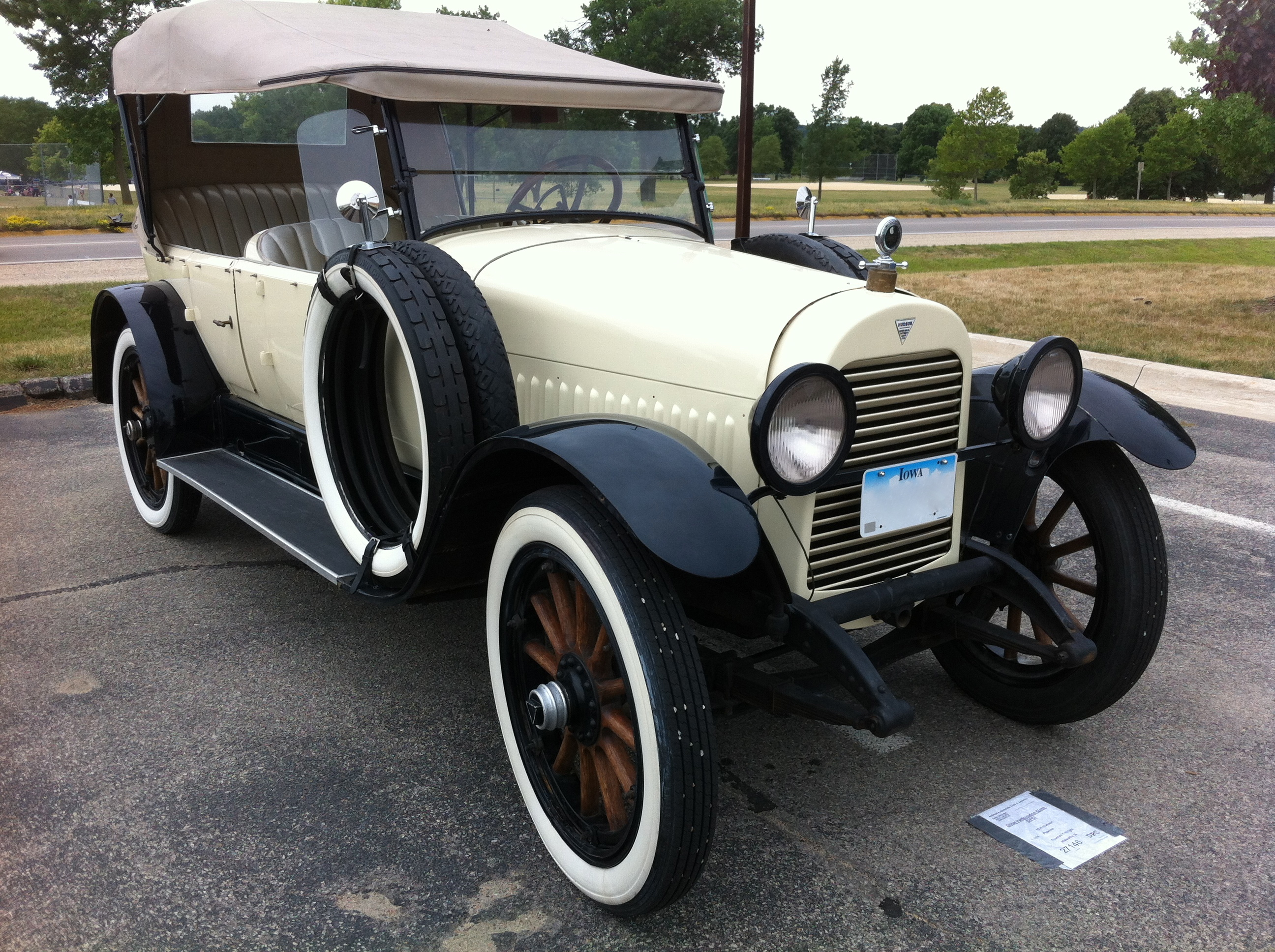
1921 Hudson Super Six phaeton

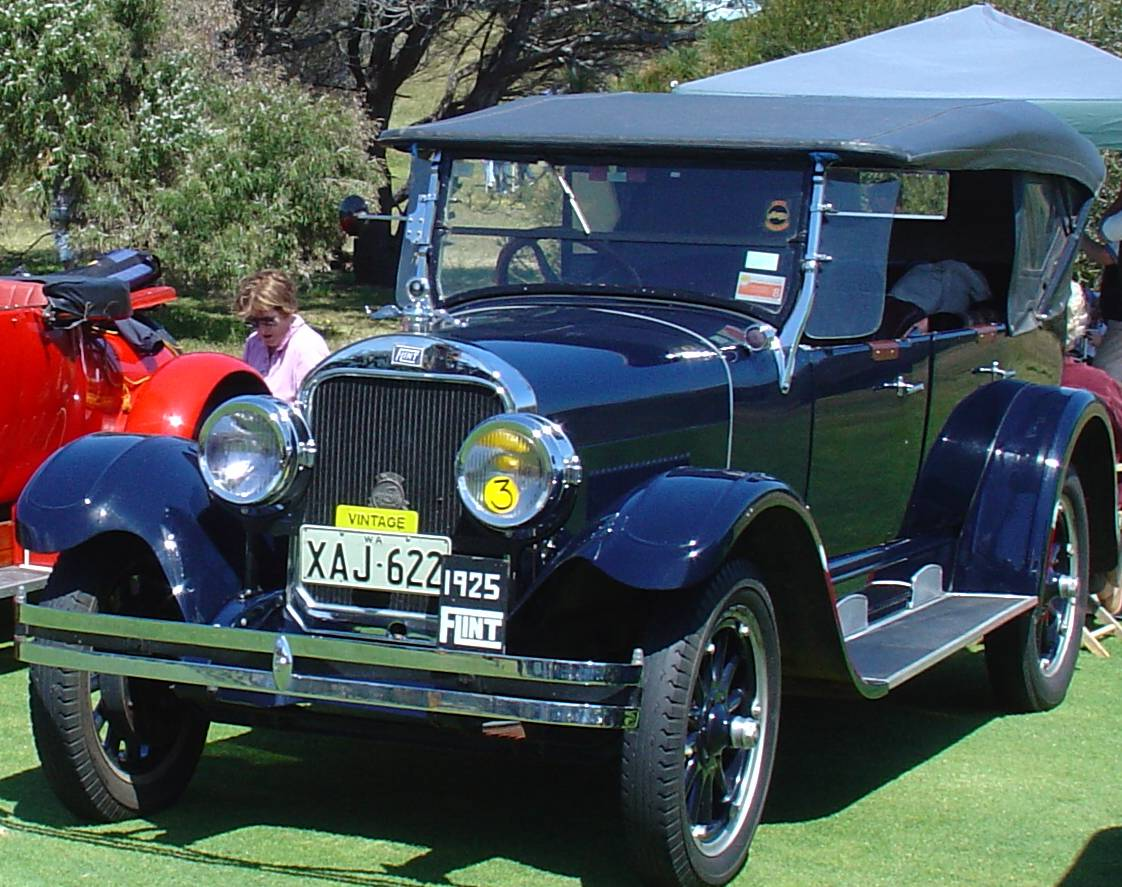
A restored 1925 Flint touring car (U.S.A.) at a rally in Australia

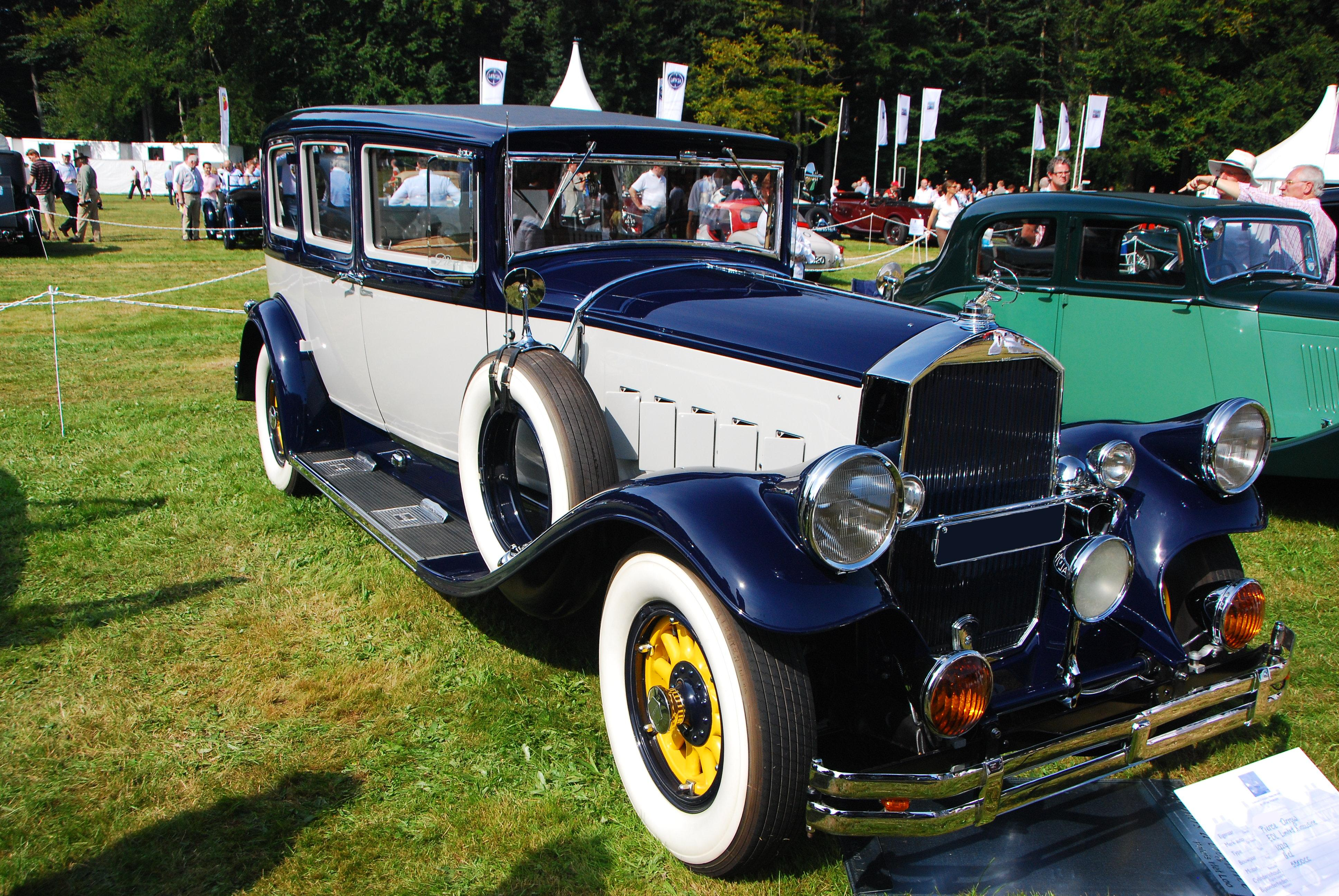
1929 Pierce-Arrow

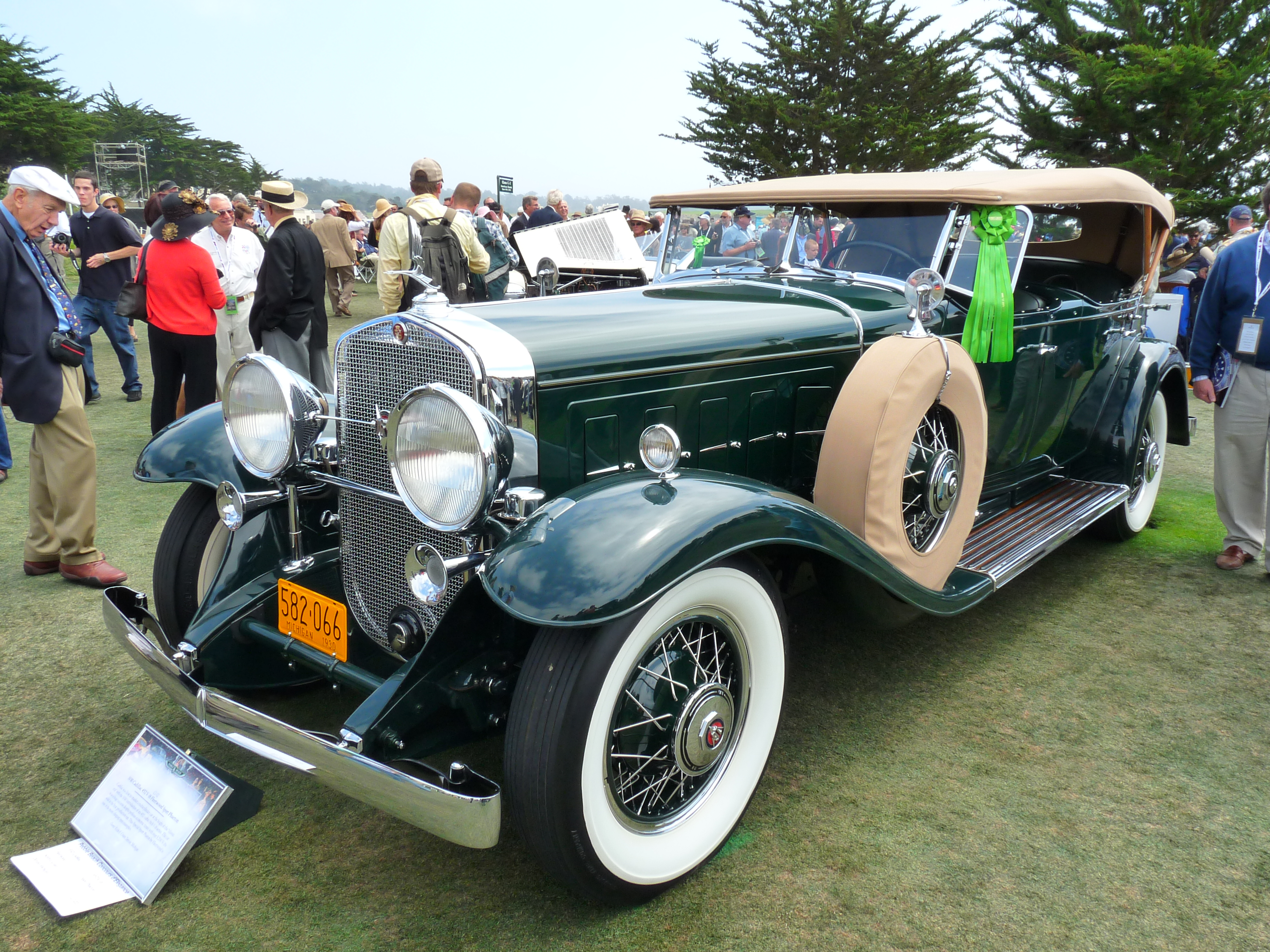
1930 Cadillac V-16 452 Sport series phaeton

A vintage car is, in the most general sense, an old automobile, and in the narrower senses of car enthusiasts and collectors, it is a car from the period of 1919 to 1930, either a "survivor" or one that has been fixed up according to the original manufacturer's instructions. Such enthusiasts have categorization schemes for ages of cars that enforce distinctions between antique cars, vintage cars, classic cars, and so on. The classification criteria vary, but consensus within any country is often maintained by major car clubs, for example the Vintage Sports-Car Club (VSCC) in the UK.

== History ==
The vintage era in the automotive world was a time of transition. The car started off in 1919 as still something of a rarity, and ended up, in 1930, well on the way towards ubiquity. In fact, automobile production at the end of this period was not matched again until the 1950s. In the intervening years, most industrialized countries built nationwide road systems with the result that, towards the end of the period, the ability to negotiate unpaved roads was no longer a prime consideration of automotive design.

Cars became much more practical, convenient and comfortable during this period. Car heating was introduced (progressing from hot bricks via double-skinned exhaust manifolds to the heater radiator matrix), as was the in-car radio. Four-wheel braking from a common foot pedal was introduced, as was the use of hydraulically actuated brakes.

=== United States perspective ===
Towards the end of the vintage era, the system of octane rating of fuel was introduced, allowing comparison between fuels. In 1923 the gasoline additive tetraethyl lead made its debut at the Indy 500 which resulted in a boost in octane from the 1950s to the 1980s In the United States drive-in restaurants were introduced as well as suburban shopping centers and motels.

Alfred P. Sloan and Harley Earl of General Motors, and Walter P. Chrysler capitalized on advertising the automobile's role in the life of the consumer for more than just the utilitarian value compared with the horse. The stock market crash of 1929 started the layoff of automotive workers and many new companies went bankrupt but over two million cars were still produced in 1929 and 1930.

=== United States Federal road and highway acts ===
The Federal Aid Road Act of 1916 was the first federal highway act. War and lack of funding hampered any positive results of this act. The Federal Aid Highway Act of 1921 (Phipps Act) started a 50/50 matching fund to states for road building and resulted in the creation of new and improved roads. During this period as well as the car adapting to society, there were better roads, and society began to adapt to the car. Dwight D. Eisenhower participated in the highly publicized Transcontinental Motor Convoy in 1919 and after becoming President the experience influenced the Federal Aid Highway Act of 1956 which included 41,000 miles of highways.

==== Depression of 1920–1921 ====
The end of World War I brought about the "Depression of 1920–1921" with an inflation rate of over 20 percent, a 7 percent Federal Bank discount loan rate, and an 11.7 percent unemployment rate, which resulted in many companies going bankrupt and the automotive industry was decimated.

==== Industry rationalization ====
From 1919 to 1929, many dramatic changes took place. General Motors went into a financial crisis that lasted until after Alfred Sloan became president in 1923. Hudson produced the Essex in 1919 which, by 1925, had propelled the company to third in total sales behind Ford and Chevrolet. Ford was in the process of building a new plant, buying back stock, and began an 18-month process of tooling-up to replace the Model T with the Model A in 1927. In 1921 Maxwell failed and Walter P. Chrysler, formerly of General Motors, was brought in to reorganize it and, in 1925, the Chrysler Corporation was formed. With Ford out for a period, Chrysler was able to produce and market the low-priced Plymouth in 1928, and bought out the Dodge Brothers, also in 1928, resulting in "The Big Three" in the United States.

There were other automakers that made it past the 1920-1921 depression only to fail during the Great Depression.

=== Europe ===
During the Great Depression, in Britain many small companies started in the post World War I boom failed or merged leaving six major manufacturers: Morris, Austin, Standard, Singer, Ford of Britain, and General Motors Vauxhall. A similar boom-and-bust cycle was seen in mainland Europe.

== Safety issues ==
Antique automobiles and early to middle era classic cars do not have the safety features that are standard on modern cars. The most rudimentary of safety features, front wheel brakes and hydraulic brakes, began appearing on cars in the 1920s and 1930s respectively.

== Collecting ==
The majority of car collectors do so as a hobby. A person can have a fascination with a certain model, make or type of car. Finding a vintage car at an affordable price is not always hard but the price will depend on the condition or the desired end result. Usually the less work required on a vehicle equates to a higher price, the more work required means a cheaper initial cost, but often more in the long run, and a person's level of restoration experience plays an important part.

=== Investment ===
Comedian and avid car collector Jay Leno stated, "Any car can be a collector car, if you collect it." Car collecting as an investment can be rewarding but most serious investment collectors seek rare or exotic cars and original unmodified cars hold a more stable price. Collecting as an investment requires expertise beyond enthusiast collecting and the standard of quality is far higher as well as a need for investment protection such as storage and maintenance. A short-term investment collector must be able to find a vehicle that has market value that is expected to rise in the foreseeable near future. A long-term investment collector would be less interested in any short-term value seeking to capitalize on an expected value rise over a period of years and a vehicle must have certain intrinsic values that are common to other investors or collectors of both short and long term.

=== Rarity ===
Cars that were made in small numbers often have a higher value but can be more difficult to maintain. Certain year and model cars became popular to modify or turn into hot rods, thus destroying their original condition. Other models were produced in such quantities that the price is still not inflated. Market trend is an important part in the price of a vintage car. A collector as an investor would have to know the potential market and have a belief that the future market will bring a return on an investment.

=== Valuation ===
Determining the value of a vintage car can be difficult, as there are many different factors that can potentially influence the price. The age, condition, rarity, modifications, vehicle history and mileage can all drastically change a car's value, among other observable factors such as body type, drivetrain and engine capacity. In recent years, services have begun providing classic and vintage car valuation data to the public, by establishing baseline prices for vehicles in various conditions and publishing marketing trends and forecasts collectors can use to monitor the state of the market. As a result of the variability in car values, most insurers offer Agreed Value insurance coverage for classic cars. Agreed Value coverage involves both the owner and insurance company agreeing on the car's value and insuring it for the agreed amount. This differs from the Actual Cash Value claim settlement method used in traditional auto insurance policies, which determines the claim value of the vehicle after a "total loss" or vehicle theft occurs.

=== Condition categories ===
To collectors and investors, a vehicle's condition rating is important, and in the United States there are two systems, the category and the points system. The category system has six categories used to rate the condition of a vehicle. The points system assigns points from 40 to 100 that correspond with the category system and below 40 there are three for other conditions. Both systems are listed together for ease of comparison:

- Category I, Perfect; 90 to 100 points. A vehicle is considered as good or better than the day produced.
- Category II, Excellent; 80 to 89 points. A vehicle in excellent original or superior restored, near-flawless condition.
- Category III, Fine; 70 to 79 points. A vehicle with an older restoration or an original car with minimal wear. These are considered "show quality".
- Category IV, Very good; 60 to 69 points. A vehicle that is in complete original condition, or possibly an older restoration, that is usually a well-cared-for daily driver.
- Category V, Good; 50 to 59 points. A vehicle that shows wear, needs attention or work, and needs only minor restoration, with no major flaws. Points from 40 to 59 fall into this category.
- Category VI, Driver; 40 to 49 points.

==== Other categories ====
- Restorable; 30 to 39 points. This vehicle would be in need of restoration of the motor, body, interior and/or chassis. A car in this class should be more or less complete, needing some parts but requiring a tremendous amount of work to get to show quality.
- Partial; 20 to 29 points. This vehicle would require extensive restoration with a significant number of parts and amount of labor—a very time-consuming and costly prospect.
- Parts car; 10 to 19 points. This would generally be an inoperative vehicle in poor condition, kept as a source or 'donor' of spare parts. With the exception of very rare vehicles, complete restoration of this category is usually not feasible.

=== Collectors plates/ Antique Vehicle Registry ===
In some places, if a car is older than a certain age, it can be approved for an antique vehicle registration.

== See also ==
- Vintage (design)
- Barn find
- Brass Era car
- Veteran car
- Antique car
- Most expensive cars sold in auction
- Car classification
- Car repair
