= ShiftMobility =

Automotive mobile app

- Type: Private
- Industry: Automotive, mobile app
- Founded: 2013
- Founders: Pavana Jain, CEO; Arvind Jain, President
- Headquarters: Foster City, California, U.S.
- Website: www.shiftmobility.com

ShiftMobility, stylized as SHIFTMobility, is a mobile platform for the automotive industry. It is the first platform to connect parts distributors, manufacturers, repair shops and car drivers through a fully integrated mobile application.

== History ==
ShiftMobility was founded as a bootstrapping business by Pavana and Arvind Jain in 2009. The company was officially launched in 2013 with Pavana Jain serving as its CEO and Arvind Jain as president. The service initially went live in the San Francisco Bay Area and Washington state, later expanding to the rest of the U.S. In 2014, ShiftMobility raised $2 million from Toba Capital. The company announced partnerships with Allied Auto Stores and Carfax in 2015.

== Service ==
According to its founders, ShiftMobility is one of the first companies connecting aftermarket manufacturers, distributors, and repair shops with each other and clients on a single platform. ShopLite is ShiftMobility's mobile app that manages parts sources for independent repair centers by connecting part manufacturer's distributor inventory and price lists to repair centers allowing immediate response to car owner's service needs. The company combined industry research and input from automotive shop owners to design the fully integrated application. ShopLite includes services such as license plate and VIN scan abilities, an OEM library with over 30 car manufacturers, and a searchable network of local OE and aftermarket distributors inventories.
