= Carcannon =

Automotive inspection company

Carcannon Corporation
- Company type: Privately held
- Industry: Certified Pre-Owned Inspections
- Founded: 2007
- Headquarters: Two Wisconsin Circle, Suite 700; Chevy Chase, MD 20815 (301) 656-7273, Chevy Chase, Maryland
- Number of locations: Washington, D.C. Los Angeles, California
- Services: Certified Pre-Owned Consultation; Compliance Review; Warranty Inspection; Pre-Delivery Inspection; Off Lease Inspection; Technical expert arbitration reporting
- Owner: Ron Correa
- Website: www.carcannon.com

Carcannon is an automotive inspection and consulting company headquartered in Chevy Chase, Maryland, with an office in El Segundo, California. Carcannon is credited with producing the first national “Certified Consultation Process” for original equipment manufacturers (OEMs). The company was founded in 2001 by Ron Correa.

== Customers ==
Carcannon sells its services to Mercedes-Benz, Porsche, Audi, Nissan, Infiniti, Volkswagen, Subaru, and the Council of Better Business Bureaus.

== Media coverage ==
=== 2006 ===
In 2006, Automotive News reported that General Motors launched an initiative to standardize the way dealerships physically present GM certified used vehicles on the dealership lots. GM hired Carcannon to create the initiative and provide the consultants to implement it.

=== 2009 ===
In 2009, US Fed News reported that the United States Patent and Trademark Office issued the trademark “New Vehicle Pre-Delivery Service Inspections” (Reg. No. 3726917, Trademark application serial number 77784580) to Carcannon.

=== 2011 ===
In 2011, it was reported that Carcannon teamed up with Audi to provide certified pre-owned inspections for all of Audi's cars.

=== 2012 ===
In 2012, Auto Remarketing wrote that Volkswagen of America selected Carcannon to give certified pre-owned consultations to all of Volkswagen's dealerships in the United States.

== See also ==
- Certified Pre-Owned
- Extended warranty
