= Guaranteed asset protection insurance =

Guaranteed asset protection insurance (or GAP Insurance) is an insurance coverage offered as a supplement to automobile insurance policies or auto loans. A GAP policy covers the difference between the value of a car (i.e., what the insurance company will typically pay), and what the borrower owes on the loan if the car is totaled or stolen. Because most cars lose value as soon as they're driven off the dealer's lot, and most car loans cover more than the purchase price of the vehicle, the "gap" between the two can be thousands of dollars.

Legally, GAP insurance is not the same as GAP waiver. A GAP insurance policy is typically regarded by state regulators as an insurance product, and regulated as such. By contrast, GAP waiver is not considered insurance in most U.S. states, provided that the auto lender agrees to waive the difference between the outstanding loan amount and the value of the vehicle at the time it was totaled or stolen.

== United Kingdom market ==
In the UK insurance market, Guaranteed Asset Protection (GAP) is often sold as a standalone product or through motor dealerships. Its relevance has increased due to the widening disparity between vehicle market values and replacement costs.

An analysis of accident management industry data from 2025 indicated that rising parts inflation and the high cost of new technology such as ADAS calibration had pushed average repair costs up by 25% since 2019. This led to a sharp increase in vehicles being written off (Total loss).

This trend has created a "payout gap" where settlement values often fail to cover outstanding finance balances.

== See also ==
- Asset protection
- Accident management
- Total loss
