= ULR =

ULR or Ulr may refer to:

- Liberal-Republican Union (Spanish: Unión Liberal-Republicana)
- the mineral symbol for Ulrichite
- Université de La Rochelle
- Uninsured loss recovery
- Ultra-long-range
- Unit leaf rate
- Unique Leader Records, a record label founded by the band Deeds of Flesh
- Ultra light rail
- a trade name of the drug Phenylpropanolamine
