= Used car =

Vehicle previously owned by another

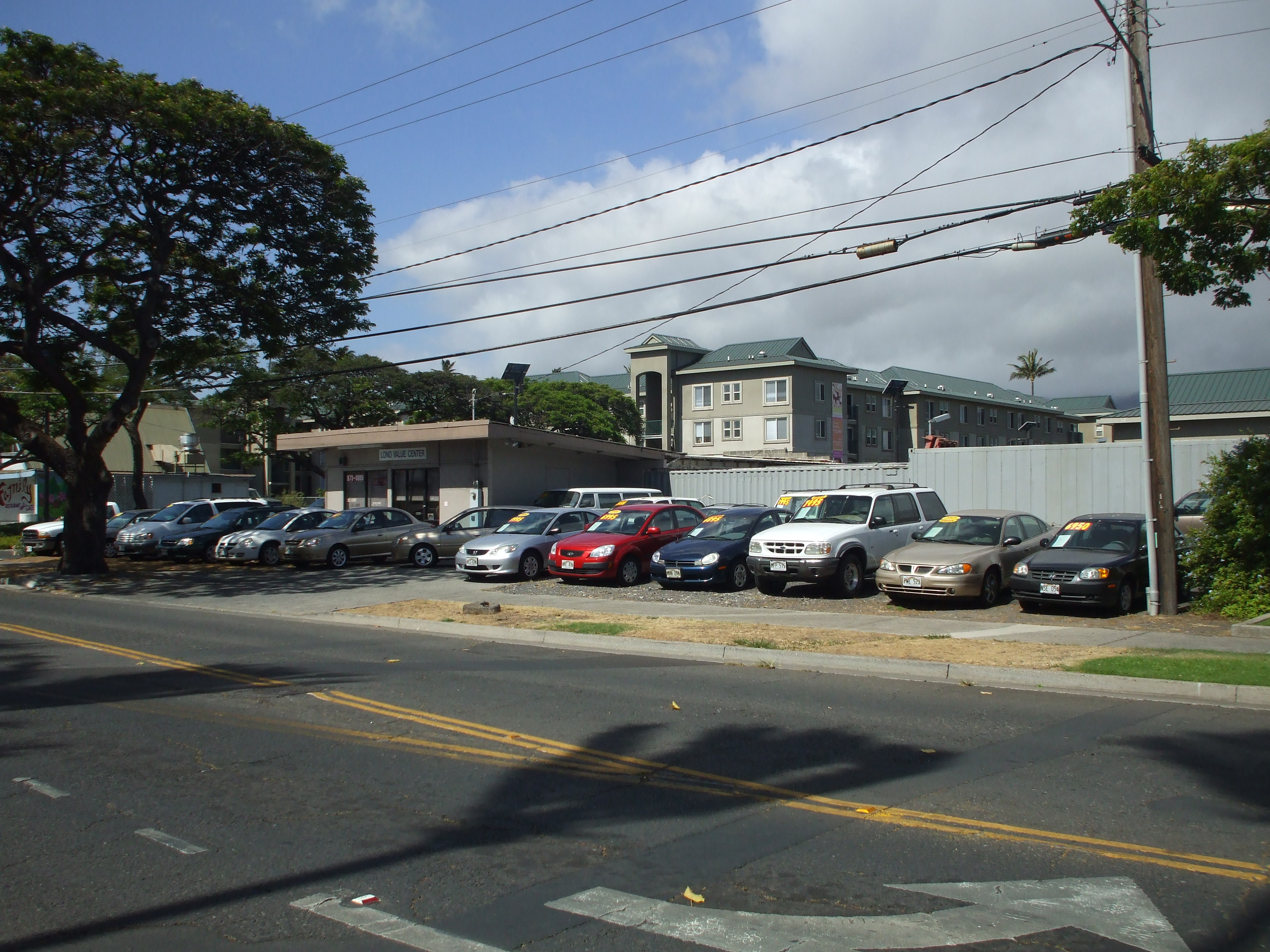
Small used car lot in the United States

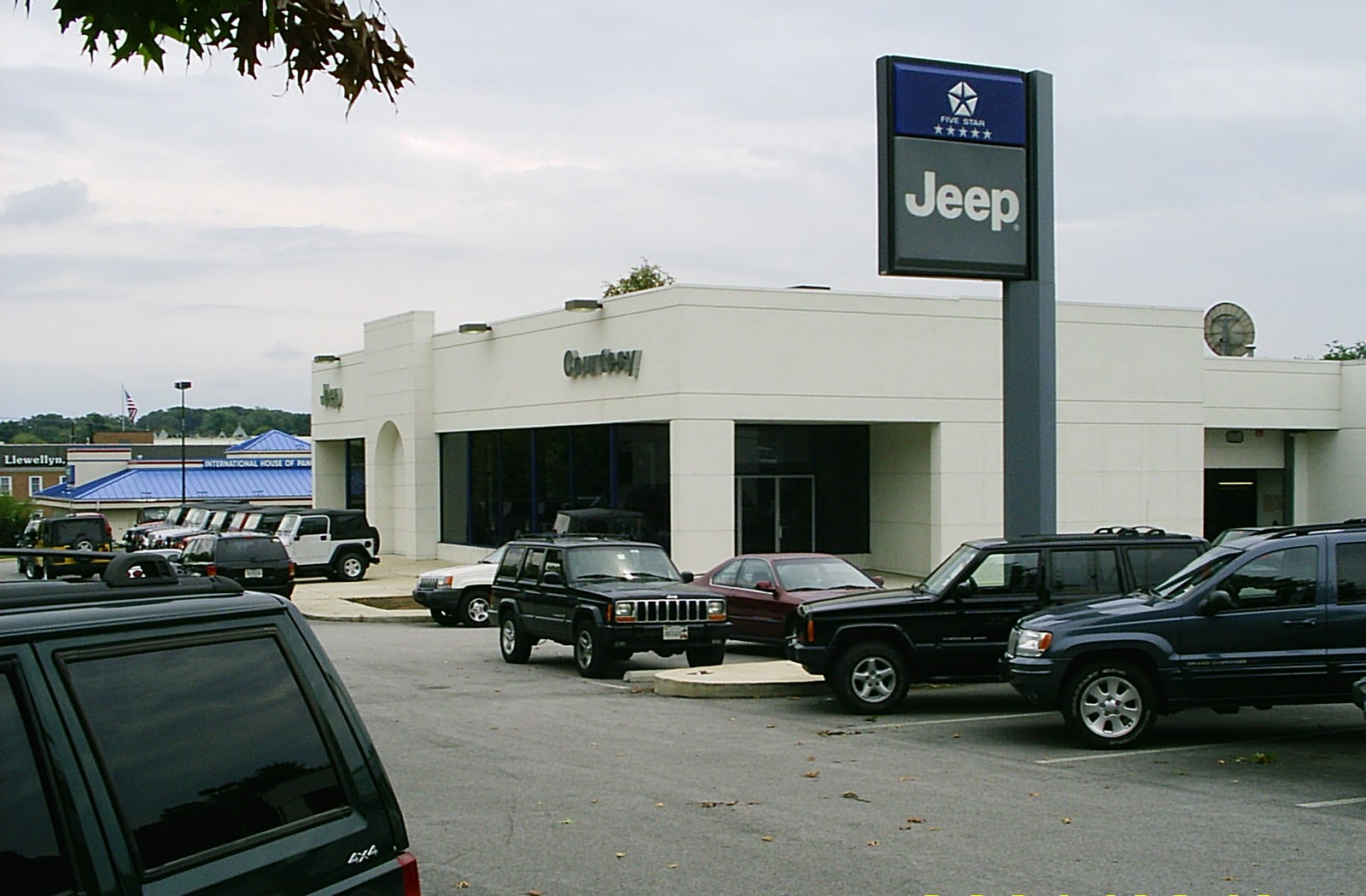
Typical new car dealership selling used cars outside the showroom

A used car, a pre-owned vehicle, or a secondhand car, is a vehicle that has previously had one or more retail owners. Used cars are sold through a variety of outlets, including franchise and independent car dealers, rental car companies, buy here pay here dealerships, leasing offices, auctions, and private party sales. Some car retailers offer "no-haggle" prices, "certified" used cars, and extended service plans or warranties.

== Used car industry ==
Globally, the used-car market is valued at US$1.81 trillion in 2025 and is projected to reach US$3.31 trillion by 2034, reflecting long-term expansion in both developing and mature automotive economies.

=== Australia ===
Used-car sales in Australia increased by about 12.1% in 2024 before slowing in early 2025 as consumer demand began to stabilize.

=== Spain ===
According to GANVAM, which is the national federation for automobile dealers, the secondhand car market in Spain accounted for more than two million units sold in 2024. Traditionally, the market has been very fragmented, involving many individual dealers and direct sales; yet the market has significantly consolidated since the late 2010s due to the development of professional retail networks.

Founded in 2012 in Alcobendas, Flexicar is the largest player in the segment of used-car retailers in Spain, operating more than 160 dealerships throughout the country with an annual revenue exceeding €1 billion in 2024.

=== United States ===
Established in 1898, the Empire State Motor Wagon Company in Catskill, New York was one of the first American used car lots.

In 2024, the overall number of used vehicles sold in the United States totaled around 37.4 million units, with 19.9 million units being sold through the retail channel, thus becoming the biggest retail sector of the American economy by volume.

With annual sales of over US$350 billion, the used vehicle industry represents almost half of the US auto retail market and is the largest retail segment of the economy. In 2016, about 17.6 million used cars and trucks were sold in the United States, and 38.5 million were sold worldwide.

In the United States, industry forecasts project that the used-car market will grow by US$40.2 billion between 2025 and 2029, supported by rising value-for-money demand and increased use of AI-driven pricing tools.

In March 2025, average prices for 1–5-year-old used vehicles in the United States increased by 1% year-over-year, reaching approximately US$31,624. This marked the first annual price increase since late 2022 and was largely driven by limited supply of near-new vehicles entering the used market.

=== Used car export industry ===
Depreciation levels of vehicles differ a lot in exporting and importing countries due to differences in income levels. The price of a vehicle depreciates faster in high-income countries than in low-income countries. Used vehicles sellers in high-income countries can thus sell their used vehicles for a higher price in low-income countries. This is the incentive to export used vehicles.

The major car exporting countries (which includes both new and used vehicles) are Japan, the European Union, the United States, and Canada.

In the European Union, 60% of used cars are marketed in other EU countries. The used car exports in the EU are focused on East Europe, the Caucasus, Central Asia, and Africa.

In the United States, used vehicle exports are focused on Mexico, Nigeria, and Benin.

The African continent gets 90% of its imports from Europe. Many of these cars would not meet European emission standards.

== Used vehicle retailer ==
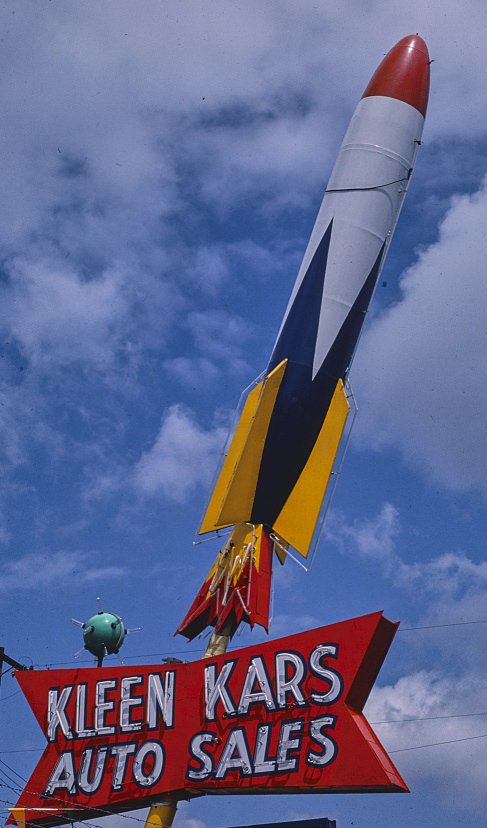
A sign for a used car dealership in Utah in 1981

In the United States, the Federal Trade Commission recommends that consumers consider a car dealer's reputation when deciding where to purchase a used car.

In the first quarter of 2025, the average amount financed for a used vehicle in the United States was US$28,338, with an average interest rate of 11.3% annual percentage rate. During the same period, banks’ share of used-vehicle financing rose to 28.4%, while captive lenders’ share fell to 7.4%, reflecting a shift in lending patterns.

By 2025, an estimated 55% of global used-car transactions occurred through digital platforms, reflecting a major shift toward online purchasing. Additionally, certified pre-owned vehicles accounted for approximately 33% of global used-car sales, highlighting growing consumer demand for verified and warrantied vehicles.

== Vehicle history reports ==
In 2006, an estimated 34% of American used-vehicle buyers bought a vehicle history report. Vehicle history reports are one way to check the track record of any used vehicle. Vehicle history reports provide customers with a record based on the vehicle's vehicle identification number (VIN). These reports will indicate items of public record, such as transfers of ownership, vehicle title branding, lemon law buybacks, odometer fraud, and product recall. The report may also indicate maintenance records and whether a vehicle has suffered collision damage, improper maintenance, or other problems. An attempt to identify vehicles that have been previously owned by car rental agencies, police and emergency services, or taxi fleets is also made. Consumers should research vehicles carefully, as vehicle reporting services only report the information to which they have access.

In some countries, the government is a provider of vehicle history, but this is usually a limited service providing information on just one aspect of the history, such as the United Kingdom's Ministry of Transport history. The US Department of Justice's National Motor Vehicle Title Registration System has only about a dozen approved data providers, about half of which sell car history data to consumers; the rest work only with car dealers. None of them are currently free of charge to consumers and many are not free even to the car dealers. The Better Business Bureau recommends using one of these approved data providers when researching a used car. The history reports use several sources to gather the data for each vehicle, including the police, the Driver and Vehicle Licensing Agency (DVLA), finance houses, the national mileage register, insurance companies, and industry bodies.

Several of the services, most notably those in the United Kingdom and the United States, sell reports to dealers and then encourage the dealers to display the reports on their websites. These reports are paid for by the dealer, and then offered for free to potential buyers of the vehicle.

In the UK, the DVLA provides information on the registration of vehicles to certain companies for consumer protection and anti-fraud purposes. Companies may add to the reports of additional information gathered from police, finance, and insurance companies. Car history check services are available online for the public and motor trade customers.

In India, the Ministry of Road Transport and Highways is responsible for providing information related to vehicle registration through the Parivahan portal. Service history data is not available from Parivahan directly, but private used car report providers offer commercial reports by sourcing maintenance records from authorised service centres.

== Used car pricing ==
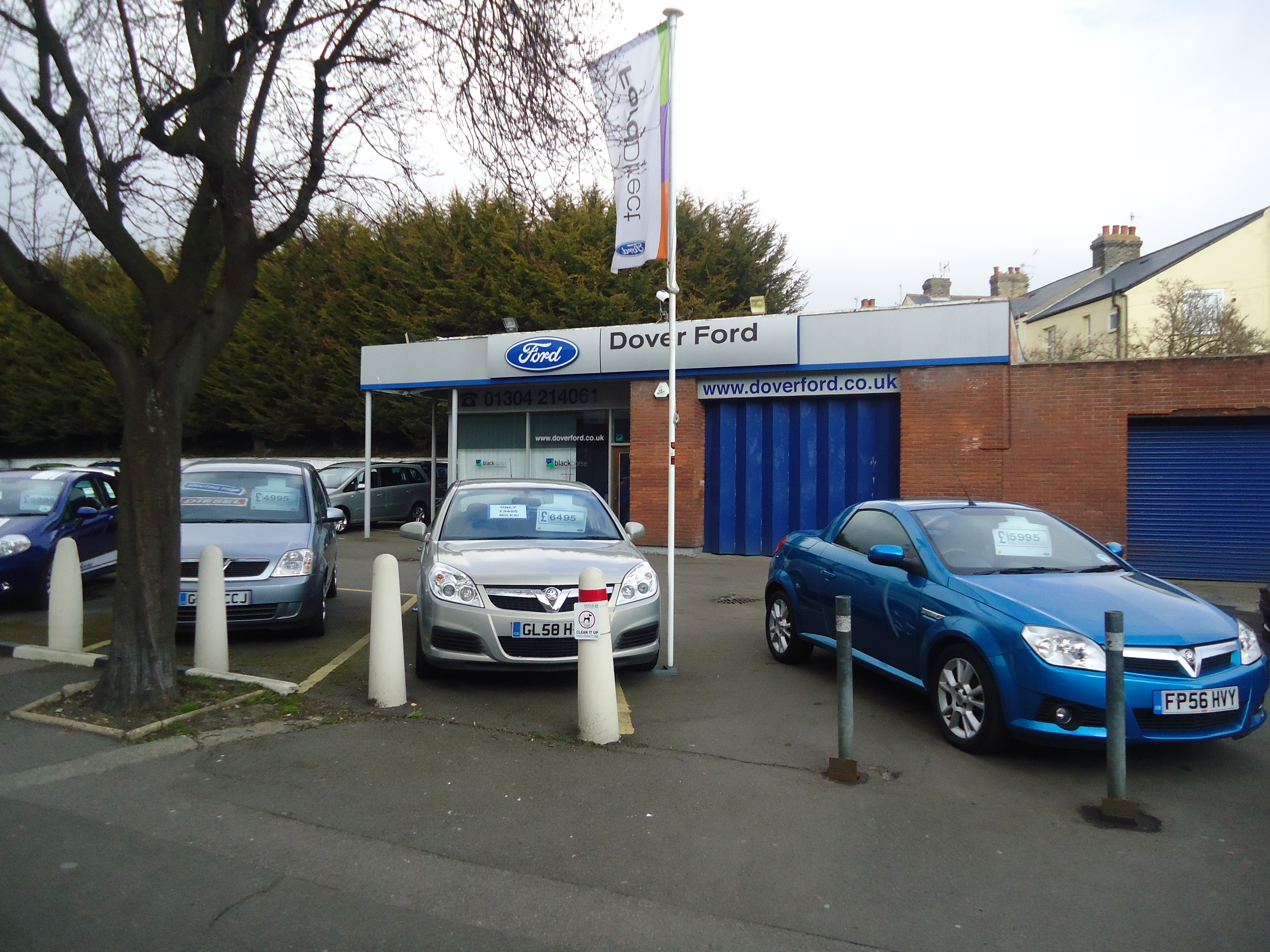

Used car pricing reports typically produce three forms of the pricing information.

- Dealer or retail price is the price expected to pay if buying from a licensed new-car or used-car dealer.
- Dealer trade-in price or wholesale price is the price a shopper should expect to receive from a dealer if trading in a car. This is also the price that a dealer will typically pay for a car at a dealer wholesale auction.
- Private-party price is the price expected to pay if buying from an individual. A private-party seller is hoping to get more money than they would with a trade-in to a dealer. A private-party buyer is hoping to pay less than the dealer retail price.

The growth of the Internet has fueled the availability of information on the prices of used cars in the name of car valuation. On average in the US, new vehicles lose about 20% to 30% of their value within the first year and around 60% of their original value after five years. This information was once only available in trade publications that dealers had access to. There are now numerous sources, such as online appraisal tools and internet classified ads, for used car pricing. Multiple sources of used car pricing means that listed values from different sources may differ. Each pricing guide receiving data from different sources and makes different judgments about that data.

The pricing of used cars can be affected by geography. For example, convertibles have a higher demand in warmer climates than in cooler areas. Similarly, pickup trucks may be more in demand in rural than urban settings. The overall condition of the vehicle has a major impact on pricing. Condition is based on appearances, vehicle history, mechanical condition, and mileage. There is much subjectivity in how the condition of a car is evaluated.

There are various theories as to how the market determines the prices of used cars sold by private parties, especially relative to new cars. One theory suggests that new car dealers are able to put more effort into selling a car, and can therefore stimulate stronger demand. Another theory suggests that owners of problematic cars ("lemons") are more likely to want to sell their cars than owners of perfectly functioning vehicles. Therefore, someone buying a used car bears a higher risk of buying a lemon, and the market price tends to adjust downwards to reflect that.

== Laws and regulations by region ==
Countries around the world are starting to implement regulations around the import of used cars related to air quality control measures. However, most developing countries have insufficient regulation or no regulation at all when it comes to the control of emission standards for imported used vehicles.

=== Africa ===
There are some 54 African countries that set import age restrictions on used vehicle imports, while 27 African countries do not place any import restrictions on used vehicle imports, and just 4 African countries (Egypt, South Africa, Sudan, Morocco) ban all used vehicle imports.

- Mauritius, Seychelles, Algeria, and Chad set an age restriction of 3 years
- Gabon and Senegal set an age restriction of 4 years
- Libya, Mozambique, Niger, and Tunesia set an age restriction of 5 years
- Côte d'Ivoire sets an age restriction of 7 years
- Kenya, Mauritania, Namibia set an age restriction of 8 years
- Eritrea, Benin, Democratic Republic of Congo set an age restriction of 10 years
- Liberia, Nigeria and Eswatini set an age restriction of 12 years

Gambia, Ghana, Mali, Côte d'Ivoire, and Cape Verde have also implemented punitive taxation for vehicles beyond a certain age. Algeria also has an internal consumption tax and Uganda has an environmental tax. Zambia and South Africa also have an inspection test requirement as a precondition to vehicle registration on vehicle imports.

The vast majority of vehicles imported to Africa do not meet emission standards.

=== Asia ===
==== Japan ====
Japan has an inspection tests as a precondition to vehicle registration on vehicle imports

=== Europe ===
==== European Union ====
Used cars have a statutory warranty according to the system of laws of the European Union, the so-called "Liability for defects", which lasts for 12 months.

=== North America ===
==== Canada ====
In Ontario, Canada, new and used vehicle sales are regulated by the Ontario Motor Vehicle Industry Council (OMVIC). In Alberta, Canada, new and used vehicle sales are regulated by the Alberta Motor Vehicle Industry Council (AMVIC).

Transport Canada mandates that all vehicles that are not made to comply with US Federal Motor Vehicle Safety Standards are only eligible for importation if its age is 15 years old and above.

==== United States ====
Used vehicles usually must be 25 years or older to be imported, but that requirement can be waived if a Show or Display exemption is given. The exemption for Show or Display limits the mileage to 2,500 miles (4,023 Kilometers) a year, and only select cars are eligible for the exemption. Canadian-market vehicles can also be federalized under separate regulations.

There are no age limits for used car exporting. Used cars can be exported at any time regardless of age or condition.

=== Central America ===
Panama has a used vehicle import age restriction of 10 years, while Mexico has an age restriction of 5 years.

In the Caribbean, most countries have age restrictions on used vehicle imports.

=== South America ===
Bolivia, Paraguay, and Peru are the only countries in South America that allow used vehicle imports. Paraguay has a used vehicle age limit of 10 years, while Peru has it set to 5 years.

=== Oceania ===
==== Australia ====
In the Australian state of Queensland, when the odometer reading is fewer than 160,000 kilometres (99,000 mi), and the car was manufactured less than 10 years before the sale date, the warranty is three months or 5,000 kilometres (3,100 mi), whichever happens first. If the odometer reading is 160,000 kilometres (99,000 mi) or more, or the car was manufactured 10 years or more before the sale date, there is no warranty. Also, motorcycles, caravans, and commercial vehicles do not have a warranty at all. A commercial vehicle is a car with nine seats or more, as well as a vehicle that is able to carry one ton of goods, unless it is a utility, which is a car designed to carry goods. For example, a Holden Commodore Utility or a Ford Falcon Utility. As these are cars that come with the back section being part of the car's body. Other vehicles that have an interchangeable back section are regarded as cab chassis and the back of the vehicle can be ordered from the factory or can be custom-built to suit the needs of the vehicle buyer. The same as a light truck can be ordered as a tip truck or a body truck

== See also ==
- Certified Pre-Owned
- Car supermarket
- Grey import vehicle
- Decrepit car
- Lemon (automobile)
