= Federal Odometer Act =

The Federal Odometer Act, passed in 1972, modified the United States Code to prohibit tampering with a motor vehicle's odometer and to provide safeguards to protect purchasers in the sale of motor vehicles with altered or reset odometers.

The Act provides definitions and civil and criminal penalties for odometer fraud.

== Interpretations ==
The Act was intended to protect consumers buying used vehicles from odometer fraud, and is typically applied against sellers who intentionally tamper with an odometer to misrepresent the actual miles an automobile has been driven. However, in 2004 and 2006, two class action lawsuits were filed against American Honda Motor Co Inc and two of its suppliers alleging that they had violated the Federal Odometer Act because the odometers in approximately 6,000,000 Honda and Acura vehicles overstated the actual mileage by 2% to 4% even though the Act contains no provisions for odometer accuracy. Subsequently, Honda changed the tolerance of its odometers from -1%/+3.75% to ±2.5%.
