= Carfax, Inc. =

American company providing vehicle data to consumers and businesses

CARFAX, Inc.
- Type: Subsidiary
- Industry: Automotive
- Founded: 1984; 42 years ago in Columbia, Missouri
- Founders: Robert Daniel Clark; Ewin Barnett
- Headquarters: Centreville, Virginia, United States
- Area served: United States; Canada; Mainland Europe
- Products: CARFAX Reports
- Services: Digital marketing; Electronic publishing; Data brokerage
- Parent: Mobility Global Inc
- Subsidiaries: CARFAX Canada ULC; CARFAX Europe GmbH
- Website: carfax.com

Carfax, Inc. (stylized CARFAX) is an American technology company specializing in vehicle data products for consumers and businesses. CARFAX products include new and used car listings, maintenance tracking, and the CARFAX Vehicle History Report.

== History ==
CARFAX was founded in Columbia, Missouri in 1984 by Ewin Barnett III and Robert Daniel Clark. In 1986, by working closely with the Missouri Automobile Dealers Association, the company offered an early version of the CARFAX vehicle history report to the dealer market. These reports were developed with a database of 10,000 records and distributed via fax. In December 1996, the company launched its website as part of an effort to sell its reports directly to consumers.

CARFAX has undergone several ownership changes since its founding. In the fall of 1999, Carfax became a wholly owned subsidiary of R.L. Polk & Company. In 2013, IHS acquired Polk and CARFAX. In March 2016, IHS had a merger of equals with Markit, becoming IHS Markit. On February 28, 2022, S&P Global purchased IHS Markit, and CARFAX became a brand in the company's newly formed S&P Global Mobility business unit.

On April 29, 2025, S&P Global announced their intent to separate their Mobility division into a standalone public company. On July 1, 2026, Mobility Global Inc launched as a public company.

== Vehicle history reports ==
The CARFAX vehicle history report is the company's best-known product. A CARFAX Report can provide information about the number of owners a used car has had, accidents it has been in, title issues, whether it was a fleet vehicle, and its maintenance record, among other aspects of its history.

== Information sourcing ==
CARFAX claims to have access to over 35 billion records from more than 151,000 sources, including motor vehicle departments for the 50 U.S. states and the 10 Canadian provinces. The company's information sources include U.S. state title and registration records, auto and salvage auctions, Canadian motor vehicle records, rental and fleet vehicle companies, consumer protection agencies, state inspection stations, extended warranty companies, insurance companies, fire and police departments, manufacturers, inspection companies, service and repair facilities, dealers and import/export companies.

Although CARFAX continuously expands its database and resources, some information is not allowed to be provided. Under the 1994 U.S. Drivers Privacy Protection Act, personal information such as names, telephone numbers and addresses of current or previous owners are neither collected nor reported. CARFAX does not have access to every facility and mistakes are sometimes made by those who input data. In the event information is disputed but cannot be verified, CARFAX allows consumers and dealerships to add information to its reports.

== Disputes ==
=== West v. CARFAX ===
In a 2006 class-action lawsuit, the plaintiff claimed that CARFAX violated consumer protection laws by not disclosing the limitations of its service, specifically its inability to check accident records in 23 states in the U.S. while stating that its database contains information from all 50 states. The lawsuit was settled in May 2007 in the Trumbull County Common Pleas Court in Warren, Ohio. The company asserts that it has major accident information from all 50 states and it backs up its claim with a buyback guarantee. The settlement in the West v. CARFAX, Inc. lawsuit was overturned, not on the merits of the issue, but on the terms of the settlement which did not offer enough to the affected consumers and because "not enough consumers were notified and the judge should not have agreed to the settlement without knowing more about what it would cost CARFAX."

=== Accident report for wrong vehicle ===
In 2024, the Boston Globe reported the case of a driver who was unable to get Carfax to remove an obviously incorrect report of an accident for her car, which had never been in any accident. About 3,200 license plate numbers in Massachusetts overlap between commercial and passenger vehicles, and despite a police report clearly coded for a commercial vehicle, Carfax assigned an accident to the passenger vehicle instead. The company asked the driver to have the police "correct" the accident report, which did not have any errors, and eventually became unresponsive. The false Carfax report was only corrected when a newspaper reporter contacted the company, which did not apologize for the error.

== Advertising ==
Car Fox is a fictional character of the vehicle history service. Car Fox started as a puppet.

== See also ==
- Lemon (automobile)
- Vehicle Identification Number
- Vehicle title branding
