= Odometer fraud =

Illegal practice of rolling back odometer mileage on vehicles

Odometer fraud, also referred to as "busting miles" (United States) or "clocking" (UK, Ireland and Canada), is the illegal practice of rolling back odometers to make it appear that vehicles have lower mileage than they actually do. This is usually done in order to increase a vehicle's buyer interest and resale value as lower mile cars are generally precived as newer, more reliable, and less risky to buyers thus creating a price premium. Odometer fraud occurs when the seller of a vehicle falsely represents the actual mileage of a vehicle to the buyer.

According to the Office of Odometer Fraud Investigation at the US Department of Transportation, odometer fraud is a serious crime and important consumer fraud issue. In the National Highway Traffic Safety Administration's (NHTSA) 2002 odometer fraud study, the NHTSA determined that 450,000 vehicles were sold each year with false odometer readings, resulting in a cost of over $1 billion annually to car buyers in the US. In the UK, the Office of Fair Trading estimates the annual cost at £500m.

== Examples ==
Common examples of odometer fraud include situations where someone tampers with the odometer by rolling it back or replacing the odometer and failing to provide the required notice on the vehicle. According to AIM Mobile Inspections, an evaluator of new and used vehicles, the incidence of odometer rollback for the purpose of misrepresenting the mileage of off-lease used vehicles had increased by 30 percent since the beginning of 2011.

A 2017 Motorcheck analysis of the Irish used car market showed 15% of all used cars for sale are clocked, with 70% of these cars being diesel engines.

== Practices ==
There are a number of ways in which a vehicle buyer might determine existence of possible odometer fraud. In the US, states require vehicle purchasers to obtain a title or certificate of registration due to federal laws. These titles contain information about a vehicle's odometer history. The information can be accessed through each state's Department of Motor Vehicles. Other options to detect odometer fraud include contacting the vehicle's former owners, conducting a mechanical inspection of the vehicle with particular attention to normal but harmless wear and tear such as to floor-mats and the rubber on pedals (or to suspiciously new such items), and checking the vehicle's history report (see used car for a list of vehicle history services in different countries).

Modern cars often employ digital odometers. These odometers are said to be, in some cases, even easier to tamper with than mechanical odometers with the use of several electronic tools, most of which plug in via a car's OBD2 port.

== In fiction ==
- In the novel and 1996 film Matilda, Matilda's father is a secondhand car dealer who uses an electric drill to reverse the cable-driven odometer.
- Odometer fraud is depicted in the opening scene of the 1980 film Used Cars.
- In Ferris Bueller's Day Off, after valet attendants Sam and Victor take Cameron's father's Ferrari for a joyride, Ferris runs the wheels backwards in a futile attempt to reduce the mileage; running the vehicle in reverse does not move the odometer backwards.

== Resources ==
- Federal Odometer Laws
