= Vehicle title branding =

Permanent designation indicating a vehicle has been "written off"

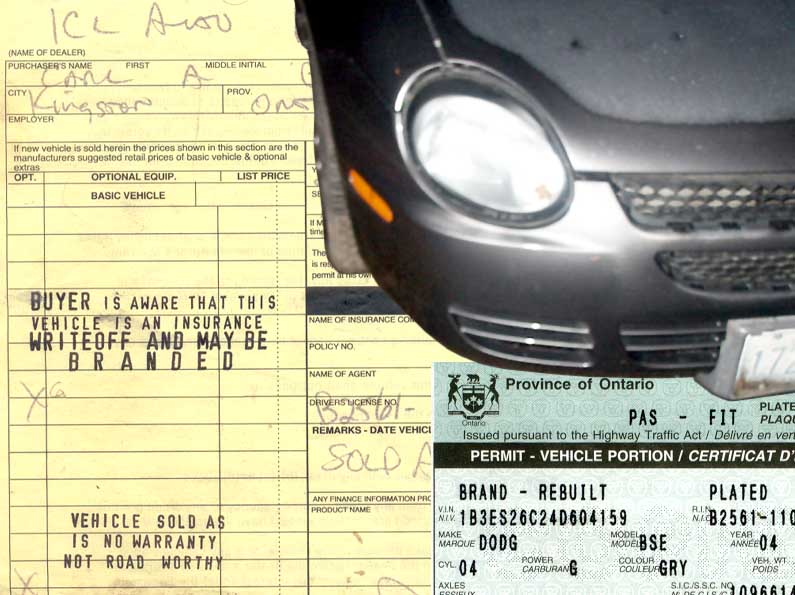
Even once rebuilt and inspected, a branded vehicle must retain a permanent record of its traumatic past.

Vehicle title branding is the use of a permanent designation on a vehicle's title, registration or permit documents to indicate that a vehicle has been written off due to collision, fire or flood damage or has been sold for scrap.

The designation or brand is mandatory in most provinces and states in North America when an insurer or vehicle owner writes off a vehicle as a "total loss". Typically this means the cost to repair the vehicle would equal or exceed the car's value, although legal definitions vary.

== Objectives ==
The title branding programs typically have two objectives:

1. A deterrent to auto theft: If a vehicle is a complete loss due to an accident, its serial number (VIN, Vehicle identification number) and registration documents could still be of potential value to persons dealing in stolen cars. The diminished sale value of a title branded vehicle reduces the profitability of switching the registration and VIN from an accident vehicle to that of a stolen vehicle of the same make and model/year, in an attempt to register it as a rebuilt car and sell it.
2. A consumer-protection warning: Cars which have been involved in serious collisions often find their way into auctions and onto dealers' lots. A permanent record of a severe accident warns potential subsequent owners that a car has been damaged (and possibly repaired). Properly repaired and carefully inspected, a vehicle may be acceptable – but an improper repair after a serious accident may leave the vehicle frame, body or key electrical and mechanical systems in damaged or non-roadworthy condition.

== Mandatory vehicle branding ==
In North America, the vast majority of vehicle titles are issued by individual provinces/states and territories. Most have implemented some branding scheme to warn subsequent owners of a vehicle of severe damage to a vehicle due to collision, theft or disaster. The brands and the criteria used to assign them vary widely from one jurisdiction to another.

Typical branding designations
Brand	Synonyms	Description
None	(clear), Normal	Has not been branded in this jurisdiction. May be a vehicle which has not been in an accident or has been in an accident minor enough that the cost of repair was less than the cost to write off the vehicle. May also be a vehicle which sustained severe damage in some other jurisdiction (if laws between the two differ significantly) or which was damaged and repaired before the introduction of vehicle branding or was damaged or repaired without notification to an insurance company.
Rebuilt	Rebuilt Salvage or Prior Salvage	A vehicle that has been previously branded as salvage but has been rebuilt/repaired and reinspected. These vehicles are driveable but the rebuilt brand remains on the vehicle's title/registration documents permanently. Some jurisdictions require that rebuilt vehicles imported across provincial or state lines be reinspected before being allowed to retain the rebuilt title.
Salvage	Severely damaged vehicle total loss	A vehicle that can be repaired but which would cost more than some predefined amount (often 75–100% of the car's value) to repair. Subject to structural safety inspection before it can be driven; documentation of repairs and sources of repair parts may also be required, depending on jurisdiction. Alternatively, some jurisdictions (i.e. NJ) issue a standard title with a "salvage" suffix to indicate a reconstructed vehicle, as opposed to a "rebuilt" or "reconstructed" title (i.e. PA).
Irreparable	Junk; Fire; Flood damaged	A vehicle that can be used for parts or scrap only.

Additional information linked to a VIN on its title
Designation	Synonyms	Description
buyback	lemon	State "lemon laws" often require that, if vendor attempts to repair a problem under a new-car warranty repeatedly fail, the manufacturer or dealer buy back or replace the vehicle. Depending on the jurisdiction, this may be required to be disclosed to subsequent owners of a problem car.
wrecked	WRK crushed baled	Vehicle has been permanently dismantled or recycled as scrap metal. This status effectively prevents the VIN from the destroyed vehicle from ever being re-used.
theft recovery		While stolen is a status and typically not a brand (as licensing agencies can refuse to issue any title document once a vehicle is stolen), previously stolen vehicles are often found dismantled, vandalised or destroyed through arson. Many are then branded and may be irreparable.
abandoned	found on road dead	The vehicle was found after being abandoned by its previous owner. Typically not a brand, but may need to be disclosed in some jurisdictions.
taxi police	fleet	The vehicle has been used in public transportation, law enforcement, daily rental or commercial applications which represent an above-average likelihood of wear-and-tear. Not a brand, but typically must be disclosed to subsequent buyers.

With the exception of 'salvage' (which may be replaced by the 'rebuilt' brand after repair and structural inspection, depending on the rules and regulations of the issuing district), the brands are permanent. Once a vehicle identification number has been associated with one of these brands, it will not be removed by authorities in that jurisdiction or in other jurisdictions with similar vehicle branding laws.

There is no consistent list of brands or of conditions under which they apply. What most US states call "junk" and most Canadian provinces call "irreparable" («irrécupérable») can be labelled "salvage" in some other jurisdiction – either because the criteria are different or because the same brand has been confusingly been given a different name. In Alberta only, "non repairable" is used to mean irreparable – in most other jurisdictions including Alberta, "salvage" means that the vehicle can indeed be repaired but that the cost of doing so is most likely prohibitive.

== Issues and limitations ==
In North America, vehicle licenses are normally issued by individual provinces and states. Each operates under different regulations.

In some cases, the criteria to define a "total loss" vary – some base the cutoff amount on the nominal value of the vehicle in working condition, others look instead at the value of a working vehicle minus the value of a collision vehicle as scrap, salvage or parts. The percentage of the original value at which the "total loss" label is applied also varies.

These differences are sometimes exploited by schemes such as "title washing", in which a vehicle branded as 'junk' in one jurisdiction is registered in another, moving from state to state until one state with slightly different regulations brands the same vehicle as 'salvage' but repairable. A vehicle with Arizona registration and a 'salvage' title for salt water damage would, for instance, represent a red flag as a vehicle possibly once affected by environmental conditions and events elsewhere such as Hurricane Katrina. Vehicles with salt water or hurricane flood damage often have severe corrosion and electrical problems which cannot be properly repaired, so are best avoided.

The system also depends on the insurer or the owner of the damaged vehicle to provide information needed to determine the cost of damage to apply the brand to title, despite the fact that doing so will further reduce the vehicle's remaining resale value. Costs estimates are widely variable; if one estimate is based on factory-new parts, another on new aftermarket parts and yet another based on junkyard parts, the numbers will vary widely – with further variance added based on who does the repairs. Damage to automotive unibody frames (commonly used in most cars since 1967 to save weight) requires special expertise and equipment to measure, with factory tolerances typically as tight as 3 mm (1/8 in).

While some vehicles (such as cars exported overseas after severe collision or damaged before the introduction of mandatory branding) may carry no warnings as to their history, others may be branded as "total loss" when they could have been quite repairable in the hands of someone willing to install used parts and do the work at a more modest price.

If a vehicle is branded as 'junk' or 'irreparable' in error, or importation paperwork indicates it as imported 'for parts', there may be no straightforward means provided in legislation to remedy these errors. These vehicles, if not exported to another jurisdiction with different regulations, will never be registerable or licensed again – even if all needed repairs are made and verified.

Such permanent records of damage do not always exist in cases where damaged vehicles retain a clear title. For example, ConsumerReports.org reported that vehicle history checks would at times produce "clean" results despite the vehicles being offered for sale as damaged on such websites as eBay.com and even eRepairables.com, a site specializing in the advertisement of salvage cars for sale.

== See also ==
- Lemon (automobile)
- Used car
- Vehicle history report
- Vehicle identification number
