= St. Louis City Directories =

St. Louis City Directories listed the residents and businesses of the city of St. Louis, Missouri from 1821 to the 1980s.

== Paxton's St. Louis Directory and Register ==
John Paxton published St. Louis' first directory in 1821. It contained the names, occupations, and addresses of heads of household. While this excluded most females, widows were listed by their married names without an occupation. In some instances, females who were presumably heads of household had their names, occupations, and addresses listed. Businesses could be found alphabetized in the residential listing. The directory ended with the constitutions of the United States and Missouri, various legal documents, and a listing of local and state officers. Because Paxton had to number houses and name streets, their alphabetical and numeric names were unique to the work. Surnames, while being faithful to pronunciation, had a variety of different spellings.

== Antebellum City Directories ==
Charles Keemle compiled and published the first series of directories for St. Louis from 1836 to 1841 known as Keemle's St. Louis Directory. They contained residential and business directories, advertising directories, and statistical information related to government officers and services, tariffs, postage rates, insurance carriers, social societies and organizations. Male heads of household were listed by name, occupation, and address. When females were listed, they appeared as either widows without an occupation or as Miss or Mrs. with an occupation and address listed. In some instances, a female would be listed with only her name and address. African American residents of both genders were identified with the abbreviation "col’d", mostly in conjunction with their occupations. The spelling of surnames could vary widely.

Other directories of the 1840s and 50s were produced by several different enterprising businessmen attempting to establish successful directory publishing businesses in St. Louis similar to the one David Gould started in the 1870s. Due to the number of publishers their content varies, but they all followed a similar form. They provided a sketch of St. Louis, both a historical and a contemporary account, a list of civic and social institutions, along with a list of the names, occupations, and addresses of male heads of households.

== Edwards' Annual Directory ==
Richard Edwards edited and published Edwards’ Annual Directory for St. Louis from 1864 to 1872. All of Edwards’ directories followed an established form and contained residential and business listings, civic and social listings, as well as introductory material describing historical and contemporary St. Louis. Male heads of household are listed by name along with their address and occupation, and in some instances, females, mostly widows, were listed.

== The Gould Directory Company ==
David Gould began publishing St. Louis' most successful series of city directories in 1872. The Gould's St. Louis City Directory followed a similar form to Edwards' Annual Directory by opening with an introduction featuring current population and financial statistics followed by an index to advertisements, a street and avenue directory, city directory, business directory, and ending with an appendix of useful information. They listed residents alphabetically by surname with their address and occupation. Male heads of households were the dominant entry. In the 1870s, females were primarily listed as widows, but by the 1890s, it becomes more common to find them listed by their name and occupation. Businesses were listed alphabetically under classified headings and in the residential directory.

=== Gould's Blue Book for the City of St. Louis ===
Elite directories contained the names and addresses of the most prominent citizens in the St. Louis region. Gould's Blue Books became the primary resource in that genre, and through their long run, they maintained a consistency in presentation and content. The most common features included residential listings arranged alphabetically and by street for St. Louis City and alphabetical listings for St. Louis County along its main railroad lines, as well as listings for St. Charles County in Missouri, and Madison and Macoupin Counties in Illinois. They also contained shopping guides and rules for proper social etiquette. They also listed social organizations and their members.

=== Gould's Red Book for the City of St. Louis ===
Gould's Red Book replaced the earlier publication of Gould's Commercial Register and featured business listings and advertisements without residential listings. They contained business listings or advertisements for the city of St. Louis. Most of these directories either complemented residential directories produced for the same year or filled in gaps for years residential directories were not published for St. Louis.

=== Gould's Red-Blue Book for the City of St. Louis ===
The Red and Blue books stopped being published in 1916 and emerged in 1918 as a combined publication known as Gould's Red-Blue Book.

== R. L. Polk & Company Acquisition ==
The Gould Directory Company was taken over by the R. L. Polk & Company of Detroit, Michigan.
