= Diminished value =

Loss of a property's market value due to damage

Diminished value or diminution in value are the terms generally used to describe the loss in a property's market value after it was damaged in an accident and repaired. Diminished value is most often associated with automobiles but it is applicable to other property of value including real estate or collectibles such as jewelry and artwork. If a property was damaged and repair failed to restore it to its original market value then said property has suffered diminished value.

Unlike depreciation, which is an anticipated and predictable loss in value over time, ‘Inherent Diminished Value’ is a loss in value due to a specific, sudden and unexpected negative occurrence. Diminished value of an automobile following an accident may occur in one of two ways (or a combination thereof):

(1) Inherent diminished value

(2) Repair-related diminished value

Inherent Diminished Value assumes proper repair has been completed and is defined as the amount by which the market value of the repaired vehicle is less than the market value of the same vehicle before the accident. Almost every vehicle that experiences an accident suffers a certain amount of Inherent Diminished Value.

Repair-related Diminished Value is the loss of market value due to improper repair of the vehicle. This type of diminished value is rare.

Usually, a vehicle with frame or structural damage cannot be resold as a "certified pre-owned vehicle." Frame damage results in high amounts of Inherent Diminished Value.

While some may claim Diminished Value is subjective and based upon perception or speculation, the old adage "perception becomes reality' applies and as such Diminution in Value is real simply because, for the most part, no reasonable and prudent person is willing to pay the same price for a vehicle with a history of damage as they would for one never having been damaged. Retailers often offer discounts for scratches and dents on appliances, electronics and dented canned goods; it is, therefore, reasonable that the value of a damaged motor vehicle will suffer a lessening in value. Mass marketing by companies such as CARFAX and AutoCheck has conditioned auto consumers to avoid buying cars with accidents on their vehicle history.

Additional factors may be taken into consideration in evaluating the loss in value of a damaged and repaired vehicle and may include, but not be limited to: the vehicle itself (i.e. rare collectible, originality, market desirability etc.), the vehicle's pre-loss condition, severity of the sustained damages (i.e. frame damage, flood, fire etc.), the subject vehicle's history (i.e. one owner, prior damage/repair, death of occupants etc.), quality and thoroughness of the performed repairs, (i.e. quality of parts, materials, workmanship, etc.) and additional value considerations including, but not limited to values associated with preowned certification programs, etc.

All U.S. states and territories except Nebraska allow third-party diminished value claims filed with the at-fault insurance. The legal basis for third-party claims is rooted in the tort law. A car owner must take the initiative to make the claim and prove their loss. An independent USPAP-compliant appraisal serves as proper proof of loss in a diminished value claim.

In hit and run, uninsured or underinsured motorist situations, a number of states allow the car owner to make a diminished value claim with their own insurance company under their Un/Underinsured Motorist Property Damage policy.

The length of time to collect Diminished Value will vary depending upon each state's statute of limitations for first-party (contractual) claims and third-party (tort) claims.

Diminished value can only be collected by the legal owner of the vehicle. That's why if a consumer leases a vehicle, they cannot collect Diminished Value because the legal owner of a leased vehicle is the leasing company.

== Diminished Value Appraisal ==
A diminished value appraisal appraises the amount of diminished value a motor vehicle has suffered. Appraisals are usually produced by auto appraisal experts experienced in diminished value. Appraisers may provide expert testimony for Appraisals, Arbitration, Mediation or Litigation in a court of law. This appraisal report is often used as proof of loss during a diminished value insurance claim. Diminished value can be defined as the difference in the market value of the vehicle before the accident and after the accident when the repairs were completed. Almost always even if the repair was of highest quality, the value of the automobile will still be considerably less than before the accident. When consumers find that a vehicle has been in an accident, most consumers will never pay the same price for a repaired vehicle as compared to one with no loss history.

Some reports include an assessment of the damage done to a motor vehicle, the quality of the performed repair, the market value of the vehicle before and after the accident. There are no set rules for measuring diminished value, and since every vehicle loses value differently, a one size fits all formula would be fundamentally inaccurate.

Reputable appraisals may differ in methodologies used but will invariably be compliant with Uniform Standards of Professional Appraisal Practice.

== Regional ==
=== United States ===
All states except Nebraska have case law allowing the car owner to collect diminished value via a third-party claim with the at-fault driver's insurance company. Georgia is unique in requiring insurance companies to proactively pay out diminished value to their own Insureds. Louisiana and North Carolina explicitly acknowledge diminished value in state statutes.

=== Georgia ===
In Georgia vehicle owners may collect diminished value from their own policy even when at-fault. Additionally, auto insurance companies are required by the Georgia insurance regulator to proactively offer diminished value compensation to their Insureds - that means even without Insureds asking for it.

=== Michigan ===
In Michigan diminished value claims are limited to $3,000 maximum by the state's mini-tort legislation.

    - There is no diminished value claims in the state of Michigan. The Mini-Tort legislation is for the uninsured portion, typically the deductible if insured, of the damages to the vehicle, up to a maximum of $3,000. There is no reimbursement through the tort for diminished value, rental costs, or insured damages.

=== Nebraska ===
Nebraska is currently the only state in the Union where third-party diminished value claims are not legally viable. This is due to a precedent of Chlopek v. Schmall, 396 N.W.2d 103 (Neb. 1986)

=== Florida ===
Diminished value is part of the Florida Standard Civil Jury Instructions. Diminished value case law in Florida is based primarily on two cases.

- Siegle vs. Progressive Consumer's Insurance Company, 819 So.2d 732 (Florida 2002).

The ability to receive diminished value financial compensation from an at-fault driver for their negligence was decided by the Florida Supreme Court in the Siegle vs. Progressive Consumer's Insurance Company case. After Siegle insurance companies are able to exclude responsibility for the payment of diminished value to the vehicle that they insure through the language in the policy.

- McHale vs. Farm Bureau Mutual Insurance Co. 409 So.2d 238 (1982)

The Florida Third District Court of Appeal, upheld that the correct measure of damages is the cost of repair plus any reduction in the value of the vehicle. The Court also directed that proving the reduction in value is the burden of the Plaintiff bringing the claim.

=== Louisiana ===
Along with North Carolina, Louisiana is one of the few states where diminished value is part of statutory law. Diminished value compensation is regulated in Louisiana Revised Statute 9:2800.17.

§2800.17. Liability for the diminution in the value of a damaged vehicle

Whenever a motor vehicle is damaged through the negligence of a third-party without being destroyed, and if the owner can prove by a preponderance of the evidence that, if the vehicle were repaired to its preloss condition, its fair market value would be less than its value before it was damaged, the owner of the damaged vehicle shall be entitled to recover as additional damages an amount equal to the diminution in the value of the vehicle. Notwithstanding, the total damages recovered by the owner shall not exceed the fair market value of the vehicle prior to when it was damaged, and the amount paid for the diminution of value shall be considered in determining whether a vehicle is a total loss pursuant to R.S. 32:702.

Acts 2010, No. 725, §1.

=== Washington ===
On July 15, 2014, a policyholder in Washington state filed a proposed class action lawsuit in the Superior Court of Pierce County seeking diminished value insurance benefits under their automobile insurance policies. The insurance company filed a notice to remove the lawsuit to federal district court on August 20, 2014. The case is titled Johnston v. United Services Automobile Ass'n.

=== Canada ===
It's possible to recover diminished value in Alberta but not in other parts of Canada although this may change due to developments in litigation.

Until May 2021 it was possible to claim diminished value in British Columbia but Insurance Corporation of British Columbia has shifted to a no-fault regime which specifically forbids most tort actions, including diminished value claims. As the result, diminished value claims are no longer possible in British Columbia.

== See also ==
- Impaired asset
- Write-off
- Depreciation
- Certified pre-owned
- Statute of limitations
- Loss of use
