= Glass's Guide =

British motor trades guide

- Type: Private
- Industry: Automotive
- Headquarters: Freienbach, Switzerland
- Owner: Privately owned
- Website: www.autovistagroup.com www.glass.co.uk www.glassbusiness.co.uk

Glass's Guide is the leading British motor trades guide to used car prices, often referred to in the trade as "the bible". Monitoring car values since 1933, it reflects how cars have become increasingly affordable – the £145 list price for a Ford 10 De Luxe (including £5 for an optional sliding roof) was the equivalent of almost two years' salary.

== William Glass ==
William Glass was born in Scotland in 1881 and was an engineer by trade. As well as publishing the first Guide to Used Vehicle Values, he had an innovative and enquiring mind and made a number of inventions including the portable hydraulic jack, the electric switch-off kettle, the self-filling fountain pen and the through-the-propeller machine gun firing mechanism.

The founder of Glass's Guide also manufactured cars under the Firefly marque for a short period of time in Croydon. Glass's other innovations included the first motor auction and the first uniformed attendants at petrol filling stations.

== History ==
William Glass published the first Glass's Guide in July 1933. The company expanded into commercial vehicle, motorcycle and caravan values in the 1950s and 1960s, and today it provides electronic and online formats.

- 1930s Glass's Guide quickly becomes "the bible" of the UK motor trade.
- 1950s Hanns W. Schwacke applies the same idea in Germany, becoming the first in continental Europe.
- 1960s Hanns W. Schwacke expands the business in Europe under the international brand "Eurotax". Glass's launches used valuations Guides for commercial vehicles and motorcycles in the UK.
- 1970s The first estimation system, including parts prices and labour costs for all makes and models, is launched.
- 1980s Glass's introduces the PC version of Glass's Guide and acquires Editions Professionelles Glass SARL (EPG) France. Eurotax launches the AutoWert workplace software which becomes the standard for more than 50,000 users across Europe.
- 1990s Hicks, Muse, Tate & Furst acquires Glass's Information Systems Ltd in 1998 and Eurotax AG in 2000. The companies merge to form EurotaxGlass's AG, registered in Freienbach, Switzerland.
- 2006 Candover Investments buys the business from renamed HM Capital for €480 million.
- 2014 EurotaxGlass's Group introduces a mobile app version of the Car Valuation Guide in partnership with London-based Better Than Paper Limited in preparation for stopping the printing of the historic guide.
- 2017 EurotaxGlass's Group is relaunched as Autovista Group. Introduction of the new name is accompanied by the announcement of new product launches planned for 2017 and new headquarters in London.
