= National Motor Vehicle Title Information System =

The National Motor Vehicle Title Information System (NMVTIS) is an electronic system that gives valuable information about a vehicle's condition and history. NMVTIS allows consumers to find vehicle information such as title data, most recent odometer reading, history of make and model, and theft records, but not maintenance or repair history or information about manufacturer recalls. It is a software tool maintained by American Association of Motor Vehicle Administrators. It uses databases from state titling agencies, car recyclers, junk and salvage yards, and insurance carriers to produce its reports.

NMVTIS has the participation of at least 48 states. The purpose of NMVTIS is to help in efforts to prevent consumers from fraud, reduce the use of stolen vehicles and protect consumers from unsafe vehicles.
