= Car valuation =

Process of estimating the market value of a motor vehicle

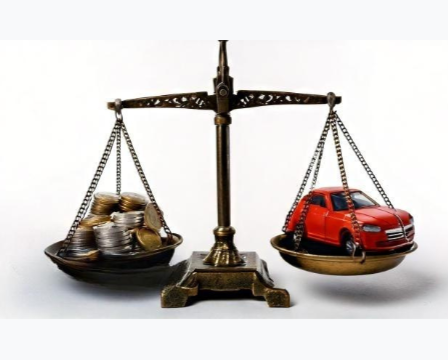
Used vehicle valuation

Car valuation is the process of estimating the market value of a motor vehicle. It is widely used for buying and selling, taxation, financing, leasing, and insurance. Because most vehicles lose value over time, car valuations are closely linked to depreciation, the measure of how a car's worth decreases as it ages and accumulates mileage.

== History ==
The practice of car valuation developed in the early 20th century.

- In the United States, the Kelley Blue Book was first published in 1926 and became a standard reference for used car prices.
- In the United Kingdom, Glass's Guide began publishing in 1933 and remains a long-established trade reference for dealers.
- Digital valuation tools became common in the late 1990s, with companies such as CAP HPI offering real-time trade values online.

== Operation and Methods ==
Car valuations can be produced through several approaches used internationally:

- Trade guides – Industry publications and databases that provide benchmark vehicle prices based on age, mileage, and market demand.
- Online valuation tools – Consumer websites that generate estimates using registration or VIN details, mileage, condition, and regional market trends.
- Auction data – Prices recorded from wholesale and public auctions, reflecting real-time market activity.
- Professional appraisals – Assessments by dealers, insurers, or independent valuers, often used for sales negotiations, insurance claims, or legal disputes.

=== Types of values ===
Vehicle valuation reports usually include more than one category of price to reflect different contexts of sale or use:

- Trade-in value – the amount offered when exchanging a vehicle at a dealership.
- Private-sale value – the estimated price in a transaction between individual buyers and sellers.
- Dealer retail price – the higher forecourt price charged by dealers, often including warranty and preparation.
- Auction value – the wholesale market price based on auction results.
- Insurance or replacement value – the valuation applied by insurers when settling claims.
- Residual value – the predicted worth of a vehicle at the end of a lease or finance term.

All of these categories are influenced by depreciation. A new car typically loses 15–20% of its value in the first year and around 50% or more within three years. The rate of depreciation varies by brand, model, mileage, condition, and fuel type. Valuation providers build their reports around these depreciation curves to give accurate current and forecast prices.

In the United Kingdom, these categories are explained in detail as part of the broader concept of used-car valuation process.

A range of specialist companies provides car Valuations. In the United Kingdom, long-established trade references include CAP HPI and Glass's Guide, CheckCarValue, Auto Experts, Parker's, and Auto Trader. In North America, the best-known providers are Kelley Blue Book (KBB), NADA Guides, and Edmunds; Canada uses Canadian Black Book; Australia uses RedBook; and in Europe values are supplied by the Eurotax system managed by Autovista Group.

== Factors affecting value ==
Car values are influenced by:

- Age and mileage
- Mechanical and cosmetic condition
- Service history
- Model popularity and demand
- Fuel type and emissions standards
- Market trends, such as shortages of new vehicles
- Regulation, such as Clean Air Zones (CAZ) and Ultra Low Emission Zones (ULEZ) in the UK, which can reduce demand for older, non-compliant cars.

== Regional practices ==
=== United Kingdom ===
In the UK, car valuations are widely used by dealers, finance companies, and consumers. Industry-standard sources include CAP HPI and Glass's Guide. Public-facing valuations are also available from consumer platforms such as Parker's and Auto Trader.

=== United States ===
US vehicle prices surged during the COVID-19 pandemic, but then stabilized somewhat.

In the US, car valuations are commonly used in trade-in negotiations, leasing, and insurance. Major valuation references include Kelley Blue Book (KBB), which has been a trusted industry standard since 1926, and NADA Guides, widely used by dealerships and consumers for trade-in, financing, and insurance valuations.
