= Lemon (automobile) =

Cars with manufacturing defects

In American English, a lemon is a vehicle that turns out to have several manufacturing issues affecting its safety, value or utility. Any vehicle with such severe issues may be termed a lemon, and by extension, the term may include any product with flaws too great or severe to serve its purpose.

== Terminology ==
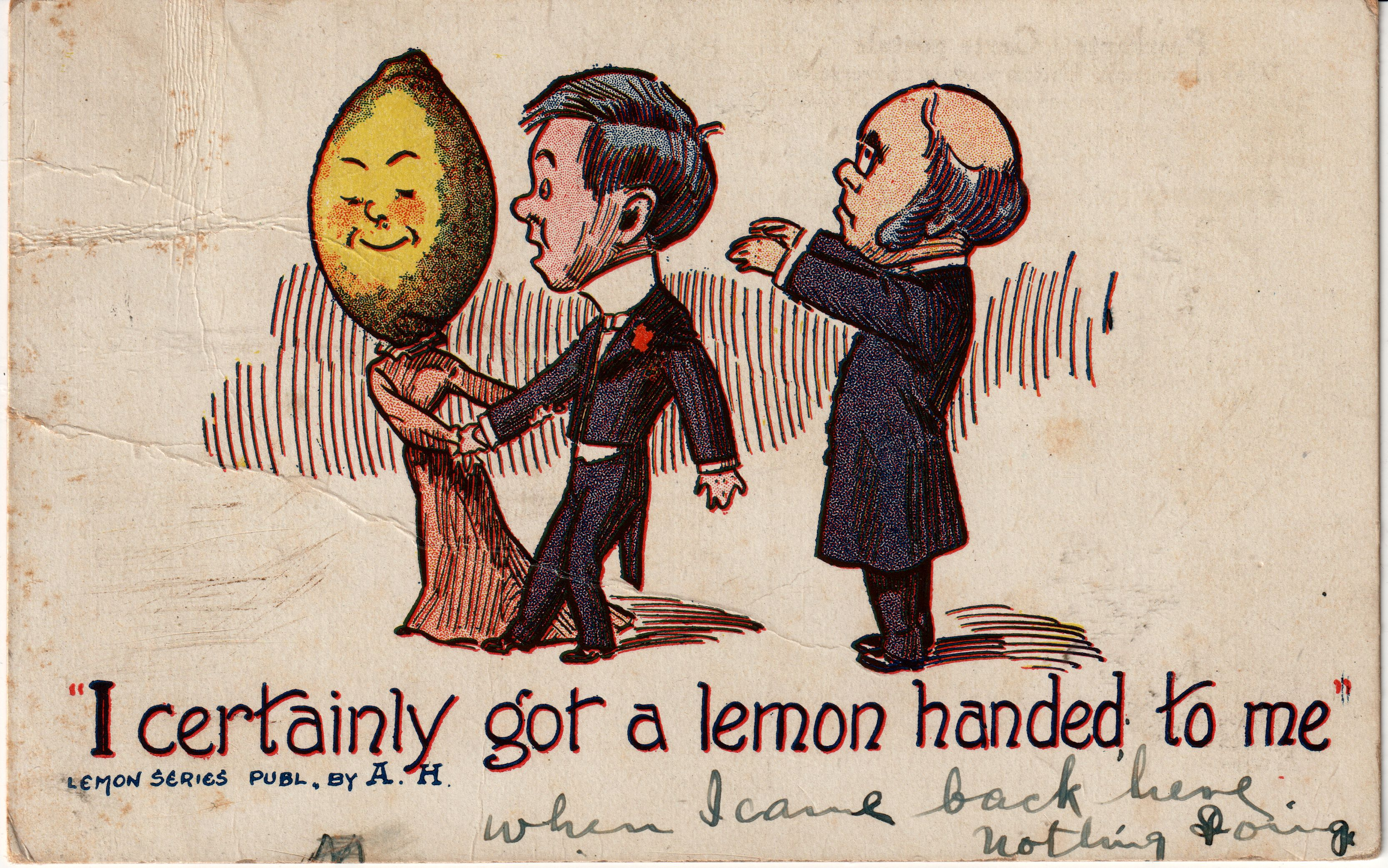
Humorous postcard "I certainly got a lemon handed to me" - circa 1909

The concept of describing a highly flawed item as a "lemon" predates its use in describing cars, and can be traced back to the beginning of the 20th century as a British and American slang term. Since 1906, "to hand someone a lemon" in British slang meant "to pass off a sub-standard article as a good one"; in 1909, American English slang use of "lemon" represented a "worthless thing, disappointment, booby prize".

Its first attribution to mean a problematic car was in a Volkswagen advertisement created by Julian Koenig and Helmut Krone as part of an advertisement campaign managed by William Bernbach, all advertising executives with the firm Doyle Dane Bernbach in 1960, which was a follow-up to their Think Small advertising campaign for VW.

In his 1970 paper "The Market for Lemons: Quality Uncertainty and the Market Mechanism", economist George Akerlof identified the severe lemon problems that may afflict markets characterized by asymmetrical information.

== Laws ==
=== New vehicles ===
New vehicles may contain flaws or defects in workmanship, caused by design flaws or by an error during the automotive factory build process. These errors can range from parts being installed incorrectly to a tool that was used to build the car not being removed or a batch of materials with structural or chemical flaws. The idiom "Friday afternoon car" was used to describe new cars that had been delivered with numerous faults or suffered from an excessive number of warranty claims early in their lives – based on the premise that assembly line workers were far more likely to make errors at the times when they were perceived to be least interested in the standard of their workmanship.

Consumer protection legislation typically labels vehicles as "lemons" if the same problem recurs despite multiple repair attempts (such as three times in a row over a short period, where previous attempts have not corrected the problem) or where defects have caused a new vehicle to be out of service for a prolonged period (typically 30 days or longer) for repairs.

Lemon laws primarily serve to force manufacturers to buy back defective vehicles or exchange them. Depending on the jurisdiction, a process similar to vehicle title branding may also be used to warn subsequent purchasers of the history of a problem vehicle. While this portion of a vehicle's history is usually not retained with the title when exporting it to another jurisdiction, at least one jurisdiction (California) has started compelling manufacturers to brand the titles of any previously reacquired vehicles that they import or export from the jurisdiction.

=== US federal law ===
The Magnuson–Moss Warranty Act is a United States federal law enacted in 1975 to protect consumers from deceptive warranty practices. The Act was sponsored by Senator Warren G. Magnuson of Washington with co-sponsors Senator Frank Moss of Utah, and U.S. Representative John E. Moss of California. The purpose of the Act was to make product warranties more easily understood and enforceable, and to provide the Federal Trade Commission with a means of better protecting consumers. The Act does not force a manufacturer to include a warranty with its products but if there is one it must be in writing and comply with the rules of the Magnuson-Moss Warranty Act.

=== Used vehicles ===
While used cars may be plagued with the same problems that beset new vehicles, used vehicles may also have been abused, improperly maintained or poorly repaired, been unprofessionally rebuilt after a collision or tampered with in some manner to conceal high mileage, mechanical defects, corrosion or other damage.

One form of lemon is called a cut and shut or clipping, a form of body collision "repair" based on buying a wrecked car and sawing off the wrecked section to replace it with a matching section from another (similar) car. If improperly repaired, these vehicles may be inherently dangerous; at high speeds, or in an accident, the car may come apart due to the weaknesses of the welds or pins connecting the two segments of the vehicle or mismatches of segments. In the UK, cut and shut cars are treated like any car that has had major repair work, resulting in what is essentially a new car. They must first be inspected for road-worthiness, be assigned a new registration number and pass the standard MOT test. If this is successful, they will be given a "Q" registration, meaning they are a kit, or composite car, and not an original unit from the manufacturer. In some states of the USA, the sale of cut and shut vehicles is illegal. Cars created using two or more large sections of previous ones are sometimes called "zipper cars".

== In popular culture ==
Lemon cars are involved in the movie Cars 2 as an antagonistic group led by Sir Miles Axelrod.

== See also ==
- 24 Hours of LeMons
- Canadian Motor Vehicle Arbitration Plan
- Decrepit car
- Lemon socialism
- List of automobiles known for negative reception
