= Accident management =

Accident management is the centralised handling of a motorist’s claim following a road traffic collision or other damages or mishaps that happen to a vehicle while on or off road. It is a cost-effective intermediary service which assists drivers in getting back on the road quickly and in managing the claims process alone. Whilst it is significantly more cost-effective for the innocent motorist, the service costs significantly more as a result - a cost borne by the insurer of the 'at-fault' driver.

The term encompasses a whole host of services; which may include 24-hour vehicle recovery, damage assessment, replacement car provision, arrangement of vehicle repairs, liaising with insurers, uninsured loss recovery, determining fault, personal injury assistance and help with paperwork.

It is a particularly useful service for vehicle fleet operators, who need to keep downtime to a minimum. An outsourced accident management service can save managers time and administration costs.

== Accident management in the UK ==
The accident management industry came about in the 1980s to address the problem of innocent motorists having to pay upfront for a replacement car after a collision, and wait weeks or even months to be reimbursed by the at-fault party’s insurer.

The service quickly proved popular with non-fault drivers, who were not getting this service from their insurer.

In the years that followed there were legal challenges by insurers on issues including costs, validity of claims and adherence to existing law. Now the rates insurers are willing to pay are set out in the General Terms of Agreement issued by the Association of British Insurers.

Accident management companies obtain their work from a range of sources, including motorists, breakdown companies, bodyshops, insurance brokers, fleet managers and dealerships.

The reputation of the accident management industry has been damaged in recent years by the competitive ambulance chasing tactics adopted by some firms to capture motorists’ personal injury claims.

Many accident management companies deal only with non-fault motorists but recently the industry has started to see the emergence of fresh customer-friendly firms which assist all drivers, regardless of fault, and help independent body shops to access more direct repair work. Today there are over 34 million vehicles on Britain's roads and over 43 million licensed drivers.

In May 2010 the Accident Management Association (AMA) and National Association of Credit Hire Operators (NACHO) merged to form The Credit Hire Organisation (CHO). The CHO is a representative body with 68 full members and 40 associate members (at March 2012) and provides a range of services to help support and establish a conducive working environment for accident management companies, insurers, government and other relevant organisations for the benefit of motor accident victims.

=== Credit hire ===
Credit hire is a specific term many people may be unaware of, despite it being an ordinary process in the insurance world. Following a road traffic accident, someone needs a replacement/credit hire vehicle while own car is unroadworthy and/or being repaired. Credit hire operators were established in the 1980s to give innocent drivers replacement vehicles on credit after an accident. These companies can arrange the repair, provide replacement vehicles and recover the cost of the hire and other uninsured losses from the person at-faults' insurer.

UK credit hire turnover in 2008 was estimated at £600-£650 million, with a further £300 million in credit repair, according to the Accident Management Association. The Association estimates that there are currently more than 100 live credit hire operators in the UK.

The Credit Hire Industry has an independent trade body called The Credit Hire Organisation (CHO). This trade body works with Credit Hire Organisations to represent the interests of non-fault drivers, of the credit hire organisations and of the industry as a whole.

=== Courtesy Car ===
Courtesy cars are like credit hire, but the difference is that credit hire services can be taken when someone gets into accident and vehicle become un-roadworthy. In that situation companies like CMC (claims management companies) or AMC (accident management companies) provide their services. They provide replacement vehicles to non-faulty person. On the other hand, courtesy car services can be taken in any situation. If somebody have problem with his/her car, in that situation person can take courtesy car services. Usually, these services charged on daily basis. These services are common practices in United Kingdom, United States of America, etc.

=== Credit repair ===
Credit repair describes the process whereby the innocent party's car is inspected and repaired at a garage of their choice, or within a network of approved repairers, at no cost to them. The company chosen to handle the claim pays the repair costs and recover these and other incurred losses directly from the person at fault's insurers.

The process is designed to help get motorists back in their own vehicles swiftly after a collision, using a repairer of their choice. The innocent driver is not usually required to pay any fees, or their insurance excess.

UK credit repair turnover in 2008 was estimated at £300 million according to the Accident Management Association.

=== Uninsured loss recovery ===
Uninsured loss recovery (ULR) is a form of insurance which drivers may consider taking out in addition to their motor insurance policy. It assists motorists and businesses in non-fault collisions to recoup the out-of-pocket costs not covered by their insurance.

Examples of uninsured losses may include hire vehicle or alternative transport costs, vehicle recovery and storage fees, lost earnings, private medical treatment, policy excesses, phone calls and damage to personal belongings.

=== Motor insurance claims ===
In 2008 the UK insurance industry paid out £18.4 million per day in private motor car claims, and more than one in six private drivers make a motoring claim each year, according to figures from the Association of British Insurers.

As part of an accident management service, in the situation where the case appears in court, lawyers work the case from both ends and ensure payments for the settlement or claim are handled properly. Lawyers may also need to appear in court if changes are requested to the settlement. In determining compensation for more difficult-to-judge pain and suffering, an accident management service often also provides the resources to handle this aspect.

The ABI describes whiplash as a “major societal phenomenon”, with their research showing nearly half a million people make a whiplash claim every year, leading to nearly £2 billion a year in compensation payments.

The Insurance Fraud Bureau's (IFB) 2006 figures estimated that the detected fraudulent claims based on ‘staged’ accidents represent 5% of whiplash claims, costing the insurance industry between £75-£110 million per year.

=== Consumer choice ===
Insurance companies arrange accident repairs to keep their costs down, but vehicle owners have the right to choose where they have their vehicle repaired.

Many insurers have networks of “approved” repairers and will try to coerce motorists into using their network, but motorists are not obliged to do this.

The Association of British Insurers, the Financial Services Authority and the Office of Fair Trading all agree the choice is the consumer's and there are very few exceptions to this rule.

=== General Terms of Agreement (GTA) ===
To reduce friction and litigation costs between insurance companies and accident management providers, the industry operates under a voluntary protocol known as the General Terms of Agreement (GTA). Established in 1999 by the Association of British Insurers (ABI), the GTA sets out agreed settlement rates, vehicle groupings, and procedural standards for credit hire claims.

Subscribers to the GTA (which include insurers and Credit Hire Organisations) agree to resolve disputes through a structured framework rather than court litigation. As of 2025, the protocol is administered by the GTA Technical Committee, which oversees annual rate reviews and dispute resolution mechanisms.

=== Market trends ===
Since 2020, the UK accident management sector has faced significant operational challenges driven by global supply chain disruptions and inflation.

The rising cost of energy and parts, combined with the technical complexity of repairing modern vehicles equipped with ADAS, has compressed industry margins. Consequently, insurers and management companies have reported a sharp increase in the ratio of vehicles declared a total loss (write-off) rather than being repaired.

Industry data from 2025 indicated that while average repair costs had risen by approximately 25% over the preceding six years, the volume of write-offs had outpaced this growth, creating a "payout gap" where settlement figures often lag behind real-world vehicle replacement costs.
