= Certified pre-owned =

Type of used car

Certified pre-owned (CPO) programs refurbish and provide an extended warranty to used items, commonly automobiles. Manufacturers or their dealers buy, inspect and refurbish used items, then resell them, usually at a premium, over the normal market price for uncertified used items. Buyers pay this premium since they believe the manufacturer's certification and extended warranty reduce the risk of buying a used product. Certified pre-owned vehicles are an important segment of the used car and truck markets in some countries. Certified pre-owned programs cover other products beside motor vehicles; these include luxury watches, exercise machines, and business jets among other things.
