= Lemon law =

Consumer protection laws

Lemon laws are laws that provide a remedy for purchasers of cars and other consumer goods in order to compensate for products that repeatedly fail to meet standards of quality and performance. Although many types of products can be defective, the term "lemon" is mostly used to describe defective motor vehicles, such as cars, trucks, and motorcycles.

== United States ==
Lemon law protection arises under state law, with every U.S. state and the District of Columbia having its own lemon law. Although the exact criteria vary by state, new vehicle lemon laws require that an auto manufacturer repurchase a vehicle that has a significant defect that the manufacturer is unable to repair within a reasonable amount of time. Lemon laws consider the nature of the problem with the vehicle, the number of days that the vehicle is unavailable to the consumer for service of the same mechanical issue, and the number of repair attempts made. If repairs cannot be completed within the total number of days described in the state statute, the manufacturer becomes obligated to buy back the defective vehicle. The dealership itself has no obligation to buy back the vehicle, because the dealership does not warrant the vehicle, the manufacturer does.

Lemon laws offer remedies that exceed the scope of a vehicle manufacturer's warranty. While a manufacturer's warranty might obligate a vehicle manufacturer to make a repair at no cost to the consumer, warranties do not include maximum time periods for the completion of repair, nor do they trigger buy-back provisions if the repair cannot be completed within such a time period.

Some state lemon laws cover only certain classes of vehicle, such as vehicles purchased for individual use but not for business use, or vehicles under a certain gross weight.

California extends its lemon laws to active duty military personnel transferred to the state after purchasing a vehicle in another state.

A small number of states additionally have more limited lemon laws that cover used vehicles. New York State is one state with a used car lemon law. Some states have lemon laws that apply to pet purchases. California has a broad lemon law, the Song-Beverly Consumer Warranty Act, which covers a wide range of products, including vehicles, boats, electronics, and appliances.

=== Federal law ===
There are two types of warranties for product purchases, express warranties and implied warranties. Express warranties make specific promises about product repair, and are usually made in writing. An express warranty may be provided by the manufacturers in owner's manuals and other written sales or marketing materials. Implied warranties arise from a manufacturer's duty to meet certain minimum standards of quality whereby the product is fit for use for the purpose intended. An implied warranty arises from the sale itself, and need not be in writing. In each type the manufacturer assumes the liability and responsibility to correct the defect and, in the event that they cannot meet that duty, may be required to repurchase or replace the product.

The Magnuson-Moss Warranty Act was enacted as a federal law in 1975, and protects citizens of all states, to ensure that manufacturers honor their warranties and to reduce the chance that a consumer will be misled about the nature and scope of a warranty when making a purchase. The Act extends to the purchase of consumer products, including motor vehicles and appliances. The Act also provides that the warranter may be obligated to pay the prevailing party's attorney in a successful lawsuit, as do most state lemon laws. A consumer may pursue relief under both a state lemon law and the Magnuson-Moss Warranty Act.

The existence, scope and consequence of express and implied warranties can vary under state law, and warranties for the sale of goods will often be addressed by Article II of the Uniform Commercial Code. The Magnuson-Moss Warranty Act will not protect the buyer of a product purchased without a warranty, such as a product purchased "as is" or "with all faults", but may protect a consumer who was misled into waiving the protection of a warranty.

== Australia ==
Australian car purchases are protected under Australian Consumer Law (ACL). A recent clarification to the ACL has formed a subsequent lemon law that entitles consumers to a refund or replacement for when "it has multiple minor problems that, when taken as a whole, would have stopped someone from buying it if they’d known about them". Consumers are entitled to a refund or replacement when a car has a major failure, as defined by the ACL, but manufactures commonly pass them off as minor problems to avoid having to replace the car or refund the consumer as minor problems only require repair within a reasonable amount of time.

Consumers have been known to take creative measures to try to convince vehicle manufacturers to buy back defective vehicles. The Queensland Parliament conducted an inquiry on the need for a consumer lemon law for new motor vehicles. A report of the findings of the inquiry was published in November 2015.

== Canada ==
The Canadian Motor Vehicle Arbitration Plan (CAMVAP) is the dispute resolution program for Canadians who have problems with the assembly of their vehicle or with how the manufacturer implements its new vehicle warranty. CAMVAP covers new and used, owned and leased vehicles that are from the current model year and up to an additional four model years.

CAMVAP is free for consumers, and hearings are held in the consumer's home community. The process normally takes less than 70 days from start to finish. Most consumers are able to handle their own case without the assistance of lawyers. The manufacturers do not use lawyers. Their representatives usually are serving or retired district parts and services representatives. An inspection of the vehicle normally is part of an arbitration hearing and the arbitrator can order a technical inspection of the vehicle at the program's expense if doing so is required.

CAMVAP arbitrators can order the manufacturer to buy back the vehicle; repair it at the manufacturer's expense; pay for repairs already completed; or pay out of pocket expenses for items such as towing, diagnostic testing, rental cars and accommodation related to the problem with the vehicle. The arbitrator can also determine that the manufacturer has no liability.

CAMVAP is available in all Canadian provinces and territories.

== European Union ==
In the EU, Directive (UE) 2019/771 Rules on contracts for the sale of goods between sellers and consumers applies from January 2022, to replace Regulation 2017/2394, Directive 2009/22/CE and Directive 1999/44/CE.

== France ==
In France, the Garantie des vices cachés en droit français protects the buyer against Latent defect, in relation with the United Nations Convention on Contracts for the International Sale of Goods.

== Singapore ==
A similar "Lemon Law" was passed in Singapore's parliament on September 1, 2012, to strengthen consumer protection laws. Singapore's Lemon Law applies to all goods (including consumables and perishables) but it does not apply to services.

Under the law, consumers can report a defective item within six months of delivery and it is the responsibility of the retailer to prove that the defect did not exist at the time of delivery. The consumer may have the option to request for repair or a replacement, and if that is not possible, ask for a reduction in price, or even a refund.

== Philippines ==
In the Philippines, the Lemon Law was passed in 2014. The Lemon Law covers only new vehicles.

The Supreme Court released a decision on September 25, 2024 in G.R. No. 254978-79 (Department of Trade and Industry v. Toyota Balintawak, Inc. and Toyota Motor Phils. Corp.), October 11, 2023, that buyers of defective brand-new motor vehicles may choose to enforce their rights under any available law, whether the Republic Act No. 10642, the "Philippine Lemon Law" or Republic Act No. 7349, "Consumer Act".
