= As is =

Legal disclaimer meaning "without modification"

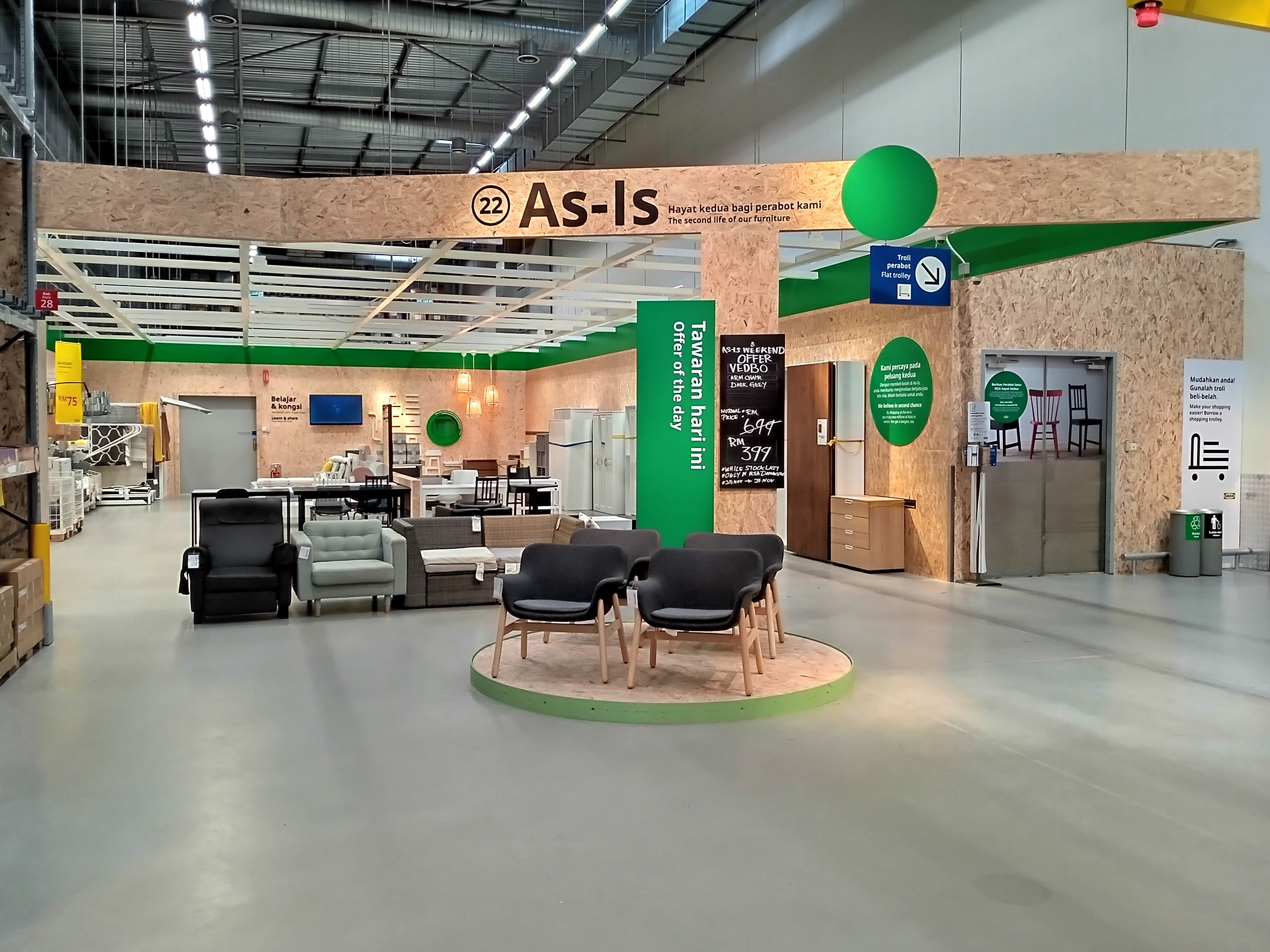
As is section on IKEA

"As is" is a phrase used to indicate the existing condition of something without any modifications or improvements. The term is employed in legal, business, and consumer settings to establish that an item or property is being sold or provided in its current condition, with no warranties or guarantees regarding its quality.

In legal contexts, the phrase "as is" is used in contracts, agreements and sales transactions, indicating that the subject of the transaction is offered in existing its condition. It is used to disclaim implied warranties for an item being sold. Certain types of implied warranties must be specifically disclaimed, such as the implied warranty of title. "As is" denotes that the seller is selling, and the buyer is buying an item in whatever condition it presently exists, and that the buyer is accepting the item "with all faults", whether or not immediately apparent. A similar concept is a "buyer beware" claim, where the careful buyer should take the time to examine the item before accepting it, or obtain expert advice.

On the other hand, the phrase "as is" does not disclaim "express" warranties: these may, for example, be created by the seller's description of an item. In other words, though the item may be sold "as is", nevertheless, if it for example does not conform to the seller's description of it, the buyer may void the sale.

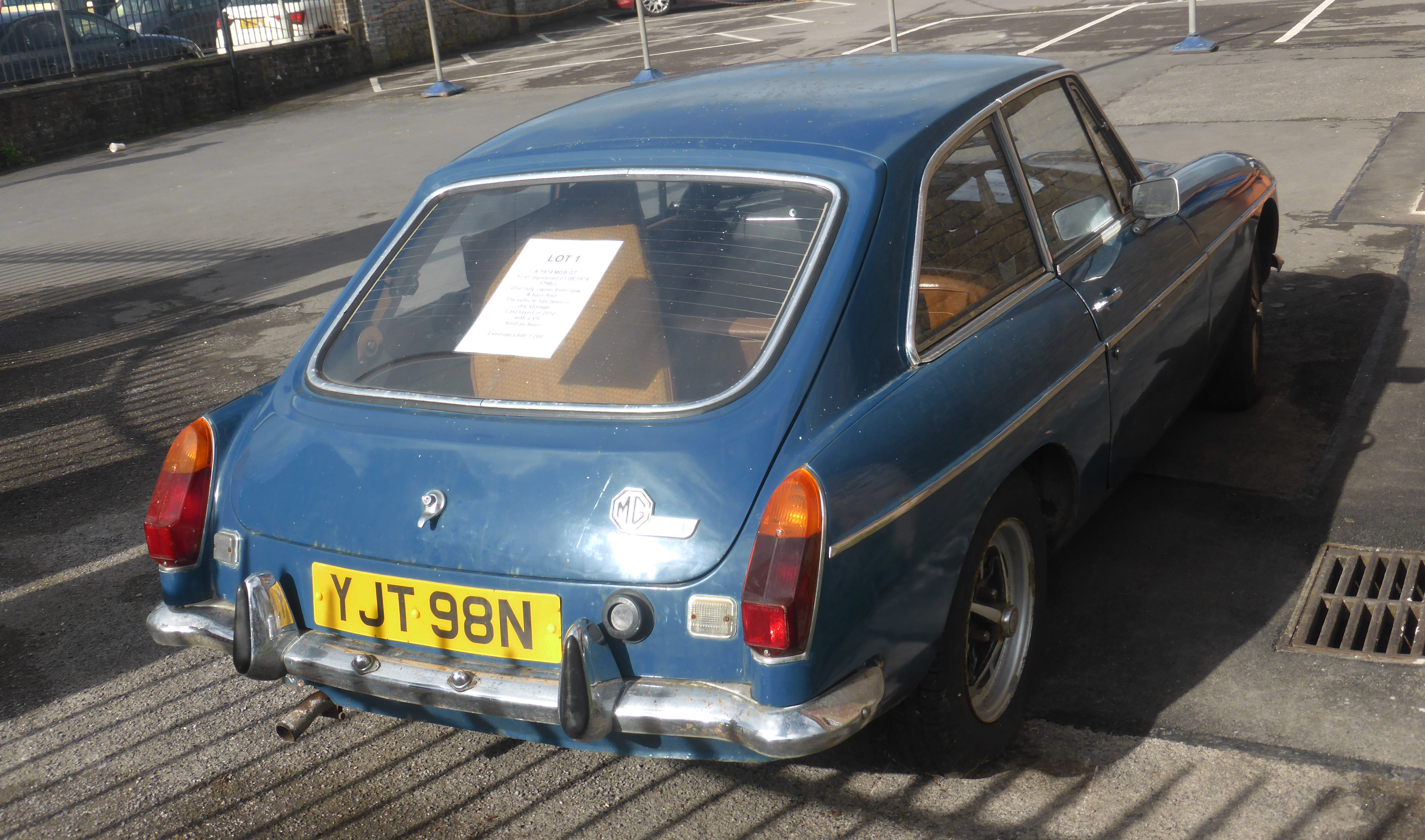
A car at an auction, the sign in its window indicating that it is to be "sold as seen"

For example, a seller of a used automobile sells it to a buyer, and puts into the contract of sale the statement: "The buyer accepts the automobile as is, with all faults." Two minutes after the buyer drives off with it, the car stalls, and the engine seizes. Unless the buyer can show that there was some fraud involved, or the seller breached an express warranty, the buyer is not entitled to a refund. This would be a specific example where fraud in the inducement could outweigh anything in the contract, express or implied: it simply does not matter what disclaimer or limitations may be found in the contract, if the contract is void (or voidable) for any reason.

Disgruntled buyers of real estate, and their respective improvements, may be faced with other complicated property law issues if a deed is conveyed as a result of a contract with an "as is" clause. In real estate, these are the larger potential problems than issues with the structure itself, which can be drawn out with an inspector. Searching public records is often difficult, and often done lazily by the seller; this means that the buyer may be burdened with liens on the home, and face various fees related to things such as public utilities.

In many jurisdictions, disclaimer of various implied warranties is void. For instance, the United Kingdom's laws on consumer protection and unfair contract terms may limit the ability of a manufacturer or seller to limit or exclude liability for various types of damage. See, for instance, the Unfair Terms in Consumer Contracts Regulations 1999 and Sale of Goods Act 1979.

However, in the United States' Uniform Commercial Code, "as is" is quoted as an example of the type of language capable of excluding all implied warranties through which the law might otherwise protect a buyer.

== American case law ==
- Lenawee County Board of Health v. Messerly

== See also ==
- Unsupported feature
