= Statute of limitations in Ireland =

Limitation periods in Irish law are set out in a variety of statutes and in judicial decisions but primarily the limitations applying to civil actions are set out in the Statute of Limitations, 1957 and the Statute of Limitations (Amendment) Act, 1991. These statutes impose a limit on the right of action so that after a prescribed period any action will be time barred. A list of cause of actions affected are listed under part two of the Statute of Limitations 1957.

The statute of limitations in the Republic of Ireland depends on the type of legal case and also who is taking the case (the rules are different for children). The time period usually starts from the date of accrual of the cause of action or (if later) knowledge of the potential cause of action.

== Limitation periods ==
=== Criminal cases ===
- Summary offences: normally 6 months but the period can vary
- Indictable offences: no limit, judges have discretion regarding excessively long delays

There are several special cases, such as tax evasion (10 years) and the use of an unlicensed television set (one year).

=== Civil cases ===
- Breach of contract: 6 years
- Personal injury resulting from negligence, nuisance, or breach of duty: 2 years for adults and 2 years from 18th birthday for infants
- Assault: 6 years
- Actions for the recovery of Land: 12 years
- Defamation: 1 year (may be extended by the Courts to 2 years)
- Maritime: 2 years

== Notes ==
- Statute of Limitations, 1957 (No. 6)
- Statute of Limitations (Amendment) Act, 1991 (No. 18)
- Statute of Limitations (Amendment) Act, 2000 (No. 13)
- Defamation Act 2009 (No. 31)
- Civil Liability and Courts Act 2004 (No. 31)
- Civil Liability Act 1961 (No. 14)
- Liability for Defective Products Act 1991 (No. 28)
