= Product Liability Directive 1985 =

European Union Directive (EU) 1985/374

Directive 85/374/EEC
- European Union directive
- Text with EEA relevance
- Title: Directive on the approximation of the laws, regulations and administrative provisions of the Member States concerning liability for defective products
- Made by: Council of the European Union
- Made under: Art. 100 TEEC
- Journal reference: L210, 07/08/1985, pp. 29-33

History
- Date made: 25 July 1985
- Entry into force: 30 July 1985
- Implementation date: See table detailing implementation by state

Other legislation
- Amended by: 1999/34/EC
- Replaced by: 2024/2853

The Product Liability Directive 85/374/EEC is a directive of the Council of the European Communities (now the European Union) which created a regime of strict liability for defective products applicable in all member states of the European Union, the other EEA members (Iceland, Liechtenstein and Norway) and the United Kingdom. Directive 1999/34/EC amended the 1985 directive.

The directive will be replaced by Directive (EU) 2024/2853 of the European Parliament and of the Council of 23 October 2024 on liability for defective products and repealing Council Directive 85/374/EEC (Text with EEA relevance) for products coming on the market after 8 December 2026.

== Background ==
The Council adopted a resolution in 1975 for a preliminary programme on consumer protection and information technology. Moves towards a strict liability regime in Europe began with the Council of Europe Convention on Products Liability in regard to Personal Injury and Death (the Strasbourg Convention) in 1977. The Pearson Commission in the UK noted that this work had started, and refrained from making their own recommendations. A second EU programme followed in 1981.

The preamble to the directive cites Art. 100 (subsequently renumbered to Art. 94, then to Art. 115) of the Treaty of Rome and the aim to achieve a single market:

The Council shall, acting unanimously on a proposal from the Commission, issue directives for the approximation of such laws, regulations or administrative provisions of the members states as directly affect the establishment of the common market.

The preamble then goes on:

... approximation of the laws of the Member States concerning the liability of the producer for damage caused by the defectiveness of his products is necessary because the existing divergences may distort competition and affect the movement of goods within the common market and entail a differing degree of protection of the consumer against damage caused by a defective product to his health or property;

... liability without fault on the part of the producer is the sole means of adequately solving the problem, peculiar to our age of increasing technicality, of a fair apportionment of the risks inherent in modern technological production;

== Content ==
Articles 1 to 12 create a scheme of strict product liability for damage arising from defective products. This liability is in addition to any existing rights that consumers enjoy under domestic law (article 13).

The directive does not extend to nuclear accidents, as these are covered by existing international conventions (article 14). The original directive did not extend to game or primary agricultural produce (article 2) but this exception was revoked by Directive 1999/34/EC following concerns over BSE.

=== Development risks defence ===
Article 15(1)(b) of the directive gives member states the option of adopting the development risks defence:

1. Each Member State may:
...
(b) by way of derogation ... maintain ... or provide in [its] legislation that the producer shall be liable even if he proves that the state of scientific and technical knowledge at the time when he put the product into circulation was not such as to enable the existence of a defect to be discovered.

As of 2004, all EU member states other than Finland and Luxembourg had taken advantage of it to some extent.

== Implementation by state ==
Because EU directives do not have direct effect, they only come into force on persons in member states when implemented in national legislation. Article 19 demanded implementation within 3 years.

Member state	Means of implementation	Date of implementation	Comments
Belgium	Loi du 25/02/1991 relative à la responsabilité du fait des produits défectueux - Wet van 25/02/1991 betreffende de aansprakelijkheid voor produkten met gebreken. Moniteur belge du 22/03/1991 Page 5884	25 February 1991	—
Czech Republic	1. Zákon o odpovědnosti za škodu způsobenou vadou výrobku 2. Zákon, kterým se mění zákon č. 59/1998 Sb., o odpovědnosti za škodu způsobenou vadou výrobku	?	—
Denmark	Lov nr. 371 af 07/06/1989 om produktansvar. Justitsmin.L.A. 1988-46002-11. Lovtidende A haefte 58 udgivet den 09/06/1989 s.1260. JLOV	9 June 1989	—
Estonia	Võlaõigusseadus	?	—
France	Act 98-389, Arts 1386–1 to 1386-18 of the Civil Code	19 May 1998	—
Germany	Produkthaftungsgesetz	15 December 1989	—
Ireland	Liability for Defective Products Act 1991	4 December 1991	—
Netherlands	Wet van 13 September 1990 houdende aanpassing van het Burgerlijk Wetboek aan de richtlijn van de Raad van de Europese Gemeenschappen inzake de aansprakelijkheid voor produkten met gebreken	1 November 1990	—
United Kingdom	Consumer Protection Act 1987	1 March 1988	—

== Review ==
Article 21 required the Commission to report to the council on the application of the directive every five years.

Date	Reference	Principal recommendations
12 December 1995	COM/95/617 final	None
9 February 2000	COM/2000/0893 final	Consultation of the basis of a Green Paper was carried out before the review. No changes to the directive but recommendations on further data gathering and expert review
14 September 2006	COM/2006/0496 final	None

In 2021, the European Commission conducted an Impact Assessment study on the possible revision of the Product Liability Directive.
