= Collateral assurance =

Of non-legal obligations, collateral assurance is a bond made over and beyond the deed itself, for the performance of an agreement, or covenant, made between two individuals; so called, for being external, and without the nature and essence of a covenant. A collateral assurance is separate but subservient to the principal contract. It usually allows for damages to be paid when the assurance is broken without allowing the principal agreement to be voided. Warranties are examples of this sort of assurance.
