= Warranty tolling =

Warranty tolling refers to a legal requirement, in some jurisdictions, that the timeframe provided in a product warranty shall be tolled (paused) to protect the consumer from unfairly being deprived of its protections.

For example, under California Civil Code Sections 1795.6 and 1795.7, tolling occurs when the buyer delivers goods to be repaired or provides notice of the problem, and continues so long as the buyer has not yet received the repaired goods or notice that the repairs are complete.

The Bar Association of the City of New York recommended in 1977 laws that enable warranty tolling.
