= Canadian Motor Vehicle Arbitration Plan =

Canadian dispute resolution program

The Canadian Motor Vehicle Arbitration Plan (CAMVAP) is a dispute resolution program for consumers in Canada who are experiencing problems with the assembly of their vehicle or with how the manufacturer implements its new-vehicle warranty. CAMVAP covers new, used, owned or leased vehicles from the current model year and up to an additional four model years old.

CAMVAP is an arbitration program, which is free to consumers. Hearings are held in the consumer's home community. The process normally takes less than 70 days from start to finish. Most consumers are able to handle their own case without the assistance of an attorney. The manufacturers do not use attorneys; their representatives are usually current (or retired) district parts and services representatives. A vehicle inspection is normally part of an arbitration hearing, and the arbitrator can order a technical inspection of the vehicle (at the program's expense) if necessary.

CAMVAP is available to owners and lessees of new and used vehicles that were originally purchased or leased in Canada from an authorized dealer (except for BMW and—by extension—MINI, the only car manufacturer which does not participate in the CAMVAP scheme). The owner (or lessee) must be a resident of Canada. Vehicles owned by businesses may be eligible if they meet certain criteria. CAMVAP is available in every Canadian province and territory.

CAMVAP arbitrators can order the manufacturer to:

- Buy back the vehicle
- Repair it at the manufacturer's expense
- Pay for repairs already completed
- Pay out-of-pocket expenses for items such as towing, diagnostic testing, rental cars and accommodations related to the vehicle's problem

The arbitrator can also clear the manufacturer of liability with respect to issues raised by the consumer.
