= Liability for Defective Products Act 1991 =

The Liability for Defective Products Act 1991 is an Act of the Oireachtas that augmented Irish law on product liability formerly based solely on negligence. It introduced a strict liability regime for defective products, implementing Council of the European Union Directive 85/374/EEC.

== Liability for Defective Products Act, 1991 ==
The Liability for Defective Products Act, 1991 was enacted pursuant to the EC Directive on Product Liability 85/374/EEC. Under the Act, a producer shall be strictly liable for damages in tort for damage (either to property or an individual) caused wholly or partly by a defect in his product .

=== Producers ===
Under the terms of the Act a producer is anyone who:

- manufactures a finished product, raw material or a component of a product.
- processes agricultural or other food products (specifically plants, livestock, fish or game.)
- makes himself out to be the producer by virtue of attaching his name, brand, trademark etc. to the product.
- has imported the product into the EU to supply it to another person as part of his business.
- has supplied the product, where the producer cannot be identified and any attempt by the injured party to elicit the producer's identity is frustrated or ignored.

Electricity is considered a product for the purposes of the Act

=== Defects ===
A defect is anything which results in the product failing to provide the safety a consumer is entitled to expect, taking into account all the circumstances . The Act expressly mentions three:

- The presentation of the product - e.g. warning labels, instructions, probably even serving suggestions.
- The use the product could reasonably expected to be put - jamming a fork into a toaster for example would almost certainly not be actionable.
- The time the product was put into circulation - relevant in that the safety of any product will diminish given enough time and in addition the standards expected by the community may increase

==== Warning labels ====
Over the past number of years a number of Irish cases have dealt with the issue of warning labels on products (mostly in connection with flammable clothing.) While developed in the context of negligence, they seem likely to inform future court judgments in terms of what constitutes a suitable presentation of a product.

In O'Byrne v Gloucester the plaintiff, a young girl, was standing next to an indoor heater when her cotton dress caught fire, burning her badly. The defendants were found guilty of negligence, in that they failed to avoid a grave and foreseeable risk by taking the easily affordable precaution of affixing a warning to the dress.

According to the decision in Cassells v Marks and Spencers, a producer of a flammable garment, need only give a basic warning. As McGuinness J said:

"In addition, I find it somewhat difficult to follow the logic of the argument asserted on behalf of the plaintiff that a warning “KEEP AWAY FROM FIRE” merely “tells people what they know already” and is too bland. The warning clearly indicates that the garment is made of flammable material - otherwise there would be no need for the warning."

=== Defences ===
There are six specific defences available . Being a strict liability statute, the defendant's taking reasonable care is irrelevant.

It is a defence if:

- it is proved the defendant did not put the product into circulation.
- given the circumstances, it is probable that the defect did not exist at the time the product was put into circulation, or it came into being afterwards.
- the product was not manufactured for an economic purpose (e.g. sale, marketing) nor as part of the defendant's business.
- the defect arises out of compliance with EU law
- the state of scientific or technological knowledge when the product was circulated was not such as to allow the defect be discovered.
- where the product is a component, the defect lay in the design of the final product into which it was fitted (e.g. where a chandelier collapsed due to being dangerously overweighed with lights, the producer of an individual bulb would have a defence.)

In addition, where the damage arose partially out of the negligence of the plaintiff, then the damages shall be apportioned as per Chapter III of the Civil Liability Act, 1961.
