= Consumer Protection Act 1987 =

Act of the Parliament of the United Kingdom

Consumer Protection Act 1987 (Note: Section 50(1).)
- Act of Parliament
- Parliament of the United Kingdom
- Long title: An Act to make provision with respect to the liability of persons for damage caused by defective products; to consolidate with amendments the Consumer Safety Act 1978 and the Consumer Safety (Amendment) Act 1986; to make provision with respect to the giving of price indications; to amend Part I of the Health and Safety at Work etc. Act 1974 and sections 31 and 80 of the Explosives Act 1875; to repeal the Trade Descriptions Act 1972 and the Fabrics (Misdescription) Act 1913; and for connected purposes.
- Citation: 1987 c. 43
- Introduced by: Paul Channon Secretary of State for Trade and Industry (Commons)
- Territorial extent: United Kingdom (Note: Section 49(1). Parts I (product liability) and III (misleading price indications) of the Act do not extend to Northern Ireland.)

Dates
- Royal assent: 15 May 1987
- Commencement: various (Note: Section 50(2)–(4).)
Other legislation
| Amends | Explosives (Age of Purchase &c.) Act 1976; See § Repealed enactments |
| Repeals/revokes | See § Repealed enactments |
| Amended by | Gas Act 1995; Fireworks Act 2003; General Product Safety Regulations 2005; Law Reform (Miscellaneous Provisions) (Northern Ireland) Order 2005; Wireless Telegraphy Act 2006; Consumer Protection from Unfair Trading Regulations 2008; Product Regulation and Metrology Act 2025 |

Status: Amended

Text of statute as originally enacted

Text of the Consumer Protection Act 1987 as in force today (including any amendments) within the United Kingdom, from legislation.gov.uk.

The Consumer Protection Act 1987 (c. 43) is an act of the Parliament of the United Kingdom which made important changes to the consumer law of the United Kingdom. Part 1 implemented European Community (EC) Directive 85/374/EEC, the product liability directive, by introducing a regime of strict liability for damage arising from defective products. Part 2 created government powers to regulate the safety of consumer products through Statutory Instruments. Part 3 defined a criminal offence of giving a misleading price indication.

The act was notable in that it was the first occasion that the UK government implemented an EC directive through an act of Parliament rather than an order under the European Communities Act 1972.

== Product liability ==
Section 2 imposes civil liability in tort for damage caused wholly or partly by a defect in a product. Liability falls on:

- Producers;
- Persons holding themselves out as producers, for example by selling private label products under their own brand ("own-branders"); and
- Importers into the European Union (EU) for commercial sale.

Liability is strict, and there is no need to demonstrate fault or negligence on behalf of the producer. Liability cannot be "written out" by an exclusion clause (s.7)

Damage includes (s.5):

- Death;
- Personal injury;
- Damage to property, including land, provided that:
  - The property is of a type usually intended for private use;
  - It is intended for private use by a person making a claim; and
  - The value of the damage is more than £275;

— but damage to the product itself is excluded, as are other forms of pure economic loss.

=== Product ===
A "product" is any goods or electricity and includes products aggregated into other products, whether as component parts, raw materials or otherwise (s.1(2)(c)) though a supplier of the aggregate product is not liable simply on the basis of that fact (s.1(3)). Buildings and land are not included but construction materials such as bricks and girders are. Information and software are not included though printed instructions and embedded software are relevant to the overall safety of a product.

The original act did not apply to unprocessed game or agricultural produce (s.2(4)) but this exception was repealed on 4 December 2000 to comply with EU Directive 1999/34/EC which was enacted because of fears over BSE.

=== Defect ===
Section 3 defines a "defect" as being present when "the safety of the product is not such as persons generally are entitled to expect". Safety is further defined as to apply to products that are component parts or raw materials in other products, and to risks to property as well as risks of death and personal injury (s.3(1)).

The standard of safety that "persons generally are entitled to expect" is to be assessed in relation to all the circumstances, including (s.3(2)):

- The manner in which, and purposes for which, the product has been marketed;
- Its "get-up";
- The use of any mark in relation to the product;
- Any instructions for, or warnings with respect to, doing or refraining from doing anything with or in relation to the product;
- What might reasonably be expected to be done with or in relation to the product; and
- The time when the product was supplied by its producer to another;

but the fact that older products were less safe than newer ones does not, of itself, render the older products defective.

=== Limitation ===
Schedule 1 amends the Limitation Act 1980. Claims under the act are barred three years after the date when damage occurred or when it came to the knowledge of the claimant. However, no claim can be brought more than 10 years after the date the product was put into circulation.

=== Development risks defence ===
Section 4(1)(e) states that, in civil proceedings, it is a defence to show that:

... the state of scientific and technical knowledge at the relevant time was not such that a producer of products of the same description as the product in question might be expected to have discovered the defect if it had existed in his products while they were under his control

This defence was allowed to member states as an option under the Directive. As of 2004, all EU member states other than Finland and Luxembourg had taken advantage of it to some extent. However, the concept had been criticised and rejected by the Law Commission in 1977, particularly influenced by the thalidomide tragedy, and by the Pearson Commission in 1978.

The UK implementation differs from the version of the defence in Art.7(e) of the Directive:

... the state of scientific and technical knowledge when [the producer] put the product into circulation was not such as to enable the existence of the defect to be discovered.

The directive seems to suggest that discovery of the defect must be impossible while the UK implementation seems to broaden the defence to situations where, while it would have been possible to discover the defect, it would have been unreasonable to expect the producer to do so. This difference led the Commission of the European Union to bring legal action against the UK in 1989. As there was at that time no UK case law on the defence, the European Court of Justice found that there was no evidence that the UK was interpreting the defence more broadly than the wording of the directive. This is likely to ensure that the UK legislation is interpreted to be consistent with the directive in the future, as was the case in A & Others v. National Blood Authority where the judge referred to the directive rather than the UK legislation.

=== Other defences ===
- The defect is attributable to compliance with a requirement imposed by law (s.4(1)(a));
- The defendants did not at any time supply the product to another (s.4(1)(b)), for example where the product is stolen or counterfeited;
- Supply by the defendants is not in the course of business (s.4(1)(c));
- The defect did not exist in the product when it was put in circulation (s.4(1)(d)), for example, where the product is damaged or altered;
- The supplier of a component or raw materials may plead that it was solely the design of the finished product into which his product was incorporated that was defective or that the defect in his product arose solely from compliance with the instructions of the designer of the finished product (s.4(1)(f)).

=== Impact ===
The UK was one of only a few EU member states that implemented Directive 85/374 within the three-year deadline. There is a view that the Act "probably represents the truest implementation" of the directive among member states. The UK did not take the option of applying a ceiling on claims for personal injury and in certain respects it goes further than the directive.

The first claim under the Act was not brought to court until 2000, 12 years after the Act came into force and, as of 2004, there have been very few court cases. This pattern is common in other EU member states and research indicates that most claims are settled out of court. Exact information on the impact of the Act is difficult to obtain as there is no reporting requirement similar to that under the U.S. Consumer Product Safety Act.

== Consumer safety ==
Section 10 originally imposed a general safety requirement on consumer products but this was repealed when its effect was superseded by the broader requirements of the General Product Safety Regulations 2005.

Section 11 gives the Secretary of State, as of 2025 the Secretary of State for Business and Trade, the power to make, after consultation, regulations by way of Statutory Instrument to ensure that:

- Goods are safe;
- Unsafe goods, or goods which would be unsafe in the hands of certain persons, are not made available to persons generally;
- That appropriate, and only appropriate, information is provided in relation to goods.

Regulations under this section cannot be made to apply to (s.11(7)):

- Growing crops and other things which are part of land because they are attached to it;
- Water, food and fertiliser;
- Gas supplied under the Gas Act 1986 or the Gas (Northern Ireland) Order 1996;
- Controlled drugs and licensed medicinal products.

=== Enforcement authorities ===
Every weights and measures authority in England, Wales and Scotland and every Northern Ireland district council has a duty to enforce, as an enforcement authority, the safety provisions in addition to the law on misleading price indications although these duties can be delegated by the Secretary of State (s.27). "Enforcement authorities" have the power to make test purchases (s.28) and have powers of entry and search (ss.29-30). Further, a customs officer can detain goods (s.31). There are criminal offences of obstructing an officer of an enforcement authority or giving false information, punishable with a fine (s.32) and recovery of the costs of enforcement (s.35).

Appeal against detention of goods is to the magistrates' court, or in Scotland the sheriff (s.33) and compensation can be ordered (s.34). There is a further right of appeal to the Crown Court in England and Wales, or to a county court in Northern Ireland (s.33(4)).

=== Breach of regulations ===
Breach of regulations is a crime, punishable on summary conviction by up to 6 months' imprisonment and a fine of up to level 5 on the standard scale (s.12).

=== Prohibition notices, notices to warn and suspension notices ===
The Secretary of State may serve on any person (s.13):

- A prohibition notice, prohibiting the supply of a product;
- A notice to warn, requiring that a notice be published at the person's expenses warning about unsafe products.

An enforcement authority can serve a suspension notice prohibiting supply of a product for up to 6 months (s.14). The supplier can appeal a suspension notice to the Magistrates' Court, or in Scotland, the Sheriff (s.15).

Breach of any such notice is a crime, punishable on summary conviction by up to 3 months' imprisonment and a fine of up to level 5 on the standard scale (ss.13(4), 14(6)).

=== Seizure and forfeiture ===
In England, Wales and Northern Ireland, an enforcement authority may apply to a Magistrates' Court for a forfeiture order to seize unsafe products where (s.16):

- there has been a contravention of regulations;
- an appeal has been made against a suspension order; or
- a complaint has been made to the magistrates.

In Scotland a sheriff may make an order for forfeiture where there has been a contravention of safety regulations (s.17):

- on an application by the Procurator Fiscal; or
- where a person is convicted of an offence under the Act, in addition to any other penalty.

Appeal against forfeiture is to the Crown Court in England and Wales, the County Court in Northern Ireland (s.16(5)), or the High Court of Justiciary in Scotland (s.17(8)).

=== Provision of information ===
The Secretary of State may require information of any person in order to (s.18):

- Make, vary or revoke any safety regulations; or
- Serve, vary or revoke a prohibition notice; or
- Serve or revoke a notice to warn.

Failure to provide information is a crime, punishable on summary conviction by a fine of up to level 5 on the standard scale. Provision of false information is a crime, punishable on summary conviction by a fine of up to the statutory maximum and on indictment in the Crown Court of an unlimited fine (s.18(4)).

== Misleading price indications ==
The Act created a crime of giving a misleading price indication in Part III, where a person, in the course of business gives, by any means whatever, to a consumer an indication that is misleading as to the price at which any of the following is available (s.20) [note that Part III of the Act was repealed by the Consumer Protection from Unfair Trading Regulations 2008]:

- Goods;
- Services or facilities, including (s.22):
  - Credit or banking or insurance services, and incidental facilities;
  - Purchase or sale of foreign currency;
  - Supply of electricity;
  - Provision of parking for motor vehicles or caravans, not including permanent residential caravan sites; or
- Accommodation, but not an interest in land unless (s.23):
  - It was created or will be disposed of in the course of business; or
  - It involves the sale of a new dwelling to a resident.

An offender can be sentenced, on summary conviction to a fine of up to the statutory maximum for Magistrates' Courts or, on conviction on indictment in the Crown Court to an unlimited fine (s.20(4)).

=== Misleading ===
A price indication is "misleading" if it conveys, or if consumers might reasonably be expected to infer, that (s.21):

- The price is less than in fact it is;
- The applicability of the price does not depend on facts or circumstances on which its applicability does in fact depend;
- The price covers matters in respect of which an additional charge is in fact made;
- Some person, who in fact has no such expectation, expects the price to be:
  - Increased or reduced, whether or not at a particular time or by a particular amount; or
  - Maintained, whether or not for a particular period; or
- The facts or circumstances by reference to which the consumers might reasonably be expected to judge the validity of any relevant comparison made or implied by the indication are not what in fact they are.

=== Repealed enactments ===
Section 48(3) of the act repealed 17 enactments, listed in schedule 5 to the act.

| Citation | Short title | Extent of repeal |
|---|---|---|
| 3 & 4 Geo. 5. c. 17 | Fabrics (Misdescription) Act 1913 | The whole act. |
| 1967 c. 80 | Criminal Justice Act 1967 | In Part I of Schedule 3, the entry relating to the Fabrics (Misdescription) Act 1913. |
| 1967 c. 29 (N.I.) | Fines Act (Northern Ireland) 1967 | In Part I of the Schedule, the entry relating to the Fabrics (Misdescription) Act 1913. |
| 1968 c. 29 | Trade Descriptions Act 1968 | Section 11. |
| 1972 c. 34 | Trade Descriptions Act 1972 | The whole act. |
| 1972 c. 70 | Local Government Act 1972 | In Part II of Schedule 29, paragraph 18(1). |
| 1973 c. 52 | Prescription and Limitation (Scotland) Act 1973 | Section 23. |
| 1973 c. 65 | Local Government (Scotland) Act 1973 | In Part II of Schedule 27, paragraph 50. |
| 1974 c. 37 | Health and Safety at Work etc. Act 1974 | In section 53(1), the definition of "substance for use at work". |
| 1976 c. 26 | Explosives (Age of Purchase etc.) Act 1976 | In section 1, in subsection (1), the words from "and for the word" onwards and subsection (2). |
| 1978 c. 38 | Consumer Safety Act 1978 | The whole act. |
| 1980 c. 43 | Magistrates' Courts Act 1980 | In Schedule 7, paragraphs 172 and 173. |
| 1984 c. 12 | Telecommunications Act 1984 | In section 101(3)(f), the word "and". |
| 1984 c. 30 | Food Act 1984 | In Schedule 10, paragraph 32. |
| 1986 c. 29 | Consumer Safety (Amendment) Act 1986 | The whole act. |
| 1986 c. 31 | Airports Act 1986 | In section 74(3)(g), the word "and". |
| 1986 c. 44 | Gas Act 1986 | In section 42(3), paragraphs (a) and (g) and, in paragraph (h), the word "and". |

== Reform ==
In October 2026, the Law Commission launched a consultation seeking to reform the product liability regime, in part to deal with questions of how the law applies to digital products.

== See also ==
- English tort law
- English contract law

== Bibliography ==
- Bragg, R. J. (1991). Trade Descriptions: A Study of the Trade Descriptions Act, 1968, and Part III Consumer Protection Act, 1987. Oxford: Clarendon Press. ISBN 0-19-825630-2.
- Fairest, P. (1988). Guide to the Consumer Protection Act, 1987. London: Croner CCH. ISBN 0-86325-135-8.
- Giliker, P.; Beckwith, S. (2004). Tort (2nd ed.). London: Sweet & Maxwell. pp. 9–014–9–038. ISBN 0-421-85980-6.
- Hodges, C. (1998). "Development risks: Unanswered questions". Modern Law Review. 61 (4): 560–570. doi:10.1111/1468-2230.00163.
- Mildred, M.; Howells, G. (1998). "Comments on 'Development risks: Unanswered questions'". Modern Law Review. 61 (4): 570. doi:10.1111/1468-2230.00164.
- Nelson-Jones, R.; Stewart, P. (1987). Product Liability: New Law Under the Consumer Protection Act, 1987. London: Fourmat Publishing. ISBN 1-85190-034-9.
- Owles, Derrick (1988). The Unsafe Product: A Manager's Guide to the Consumer Protection Act. London: Kogan Page. ISBN 1-85091-688-8.
- Shears, P.; et al. (2001). "Food for thought - What mad cows have wrought with respect to food safety regulation in the EU and UK". British Food Journal. 103 (1): 63–87. doi:10.1108/00070700110383217.
- van Gerven, W. (2000). Cases, Materials and Texts on National, Supranational and International Tort Law. Oxford: Hart Publishing. pp. pp666–683. ISBN 1-84113-139-3.
