= Magnuson–Moss Warranty Act =

United States federal law governing warranties on consumer products

- Long title: An Act to provide disclosure standards for written consumer product warranties against defect or malfunction; to define Federal content standards for such warranties; to amend the Federal Trade Commission Act in order to improve its consumer protection activities; An Act to provide minimum disclosure standards for written consumer product warranties; to define minimum Federal content standards for such warranties; to amend the Federal Trade Commission Act in order to improve its consumer protection activities; and for other purposes.
- Nicknames: Consumer Product Warranty and Federal Trade Commission Improvement Act
- Enacted by: the 93rd United States Congress
- Effective: January 4, 1975

Citations
- Public law: 93-637
- Statutes at Large: 88 Stat. 2183

Codification
- Titles amended: 15 U.S.C.: Commerce and Trade
- U.S.C. sections created: 15 U.S.C. ch. 50 § 2301 et seq.

Legislative history
- Introduced in the Senate as S. 356 by Warren Magnuson (D–WA) on May 14, 1973; Committee consideration by Senate Banking, Housing, and Urban Affairs, Senate Commerce, Science, and Transportation, House Energy and Commerce; Passed the Senate on September 12, 1973 (Passed); Passed the House on September 19, 1974 (384-1, in lieu of H.R. 7917); Reported by the joint conference committee on October 8, 1974; agreed to by the Senate on December 18, 1974 (70-5) and by the House on December 19, 1974 (Passed); Signed into law by President Gerald Ford on January 4, 1975

The Magnuson–Moss Warranty Act (P.L. 93-637) is a United States federal law (15 U.S.C. § 2301 et seq.). Enacted in 1975, the federal statute governs warranties on consumer products. The law does not require any product to have a warranty (products generally may be sold "as is"), but if a product does have a warranty, the warranty must comply with the Act. The law was created to fix problems as a result of manufacturers using disclaimers on warranties in an unfair or misleading manner.

== Purpose ==
According to the report from the House of Representatives which accompanied the law (House Report No. 93-1197, 93d Cong 2d Sess.), Congress enacted the Magnuson-Moss Act in response to merchants' widespread misuse of express warranties and disclaimers. The legislative history indicates that the Act's purpose is to make warranties on consumer products more readily understood and enforceable and to provide the Federal Trade Commission with means to better protect consumers.

The Act was sponsored by Senator Warren G. Magnuson of Washington and U.S. Representative John E. Moss of California, both Democrats, as well as Senator Frank Moss of Utah, who co-sponsored it with Magnuson.

The statute is remedial and is intended to protect consumers from deceptive warranty practices. Consumer products are not required to have warranties, but if one is given, it must comply with the Magnuson-Moss Act.

== Definitions used ==
The Magnuson–Moss Act contains many definitions:

- A "consumer" is a buyer of consumer goods for personal use. A buyer of consumer products for resale is not a consumer.
- A "supplier" is any person engaged in the business of making a consumer product directly or indirectly available to consumers.
- A "warrantor" is any supplier or other person who gives or offers a written warranty or who has some obligation under an implied warranty.
- A "consumer product" is generally any tangible personal property for sale and that is normally used for personal, family, or household purposes. The determination whether a good is a consumer product requires a factual finding, on a case-by-case basis. Najran Co. for General Contracting and Trading v. Fleetwood Enterprises, Inc., 659 F. Supp. 1081 (S.D. Ga. 1986).
- A "written warranty" (also called an express warranty) is any written promise made in connection with the sale of a consumer product by a supplier to a consumer that relates to the material and/or workmanship and that affirms that the product is defect-free or will meet a certain standard of performance over a specified time.
- An "implied warranty" is defined in state law. The Magnuson–Moss Act simply provides limitations on disclaimers and provides a remedy for their violation.
- Designations:
  - A "full warranty" is one that meets the federal minimum standards for a warranty. Such warranties must be "conspicuously designated" as full warranties. If each of the following five statements is true about a warranty's terms and conditions, it is a "full" warranty:
    - There is no limit on the duration of implied warranties.
    - Warranty service is provided to anyone who owns the product during the warranty period; that is, the coverage is not limited to first purchasers.
    - Warranty service is provided free of charge, including such costs as returning the product or removing and reinstalling the product when necessary.
    - There is provided, at the consumer's choice, either a replacement or a full refund if, after a reasonable number of tries, the warrantor is unable to repair the product.
    - It is not required of consumers to perform any duty as a precondition for receiving service, except notifying that service is needed, unless it can be demonstrated that the duty is reasonable.
  - A "limited warranty" is one that does not meet the federal minimums. Such warranties must be "conspicuously designated" as limited warranties.
- A "multiple warranty" is part full and part limited.
- A "service contract" is different from a warranty because service contracts do not affirm the quality or workmanship of a consumer product. A service contract is a written instrument in which a supplier agrees to perform, over a fixed period or for a specified duration, services relating to the maintenance or repair, or both, of a consumer product. Agreements that meet the statutory definition of service contracts, but are sold and regulated under state law as contracts of insurance, do not come under the Act's provisions.
- Disclaimer or Limitation of Implied Warranties when a service contract is sold:

Sellers of consumer products who make service contracts on their products are prohibited under the act from disclaiming or limiting implied warranties. Sellers who extend written warranties on consumer products cannot disclaim implied warranties, regardless of whether they make service contracts on their products. However, sellers of consumer products that merely sell service contracts as agents of service contract companies and do not themselves extend written warranties can disclaim implied warranties on the products they sell.

== Requirements ==
Any warrantor warranting a consumer product to a consumer by means of a written warranty must disclose, fully and conspicuously, in simple and readily understood language, the terms and conditions of the warranty to the extent required by rules of the Federal Trade Commission. The FTC has enacted regulations governing the disclosure of written consumer product warranty terms and conditions on consumer products actually costing the consumer more than $15. The Rules can be found at 16 C.F.R. Part 701.

Under the terms of the Act, ambiguous statements in a warranty are construed against the drafter of the warranty.

Service contracts must fully and clearly disclose their terms and conditions in simple and readily understood language.

Warrantors cannot require that only branded parts be used with the product in order to retain the warranty. This is commonly referred to as the "tie-in sales" provisions and is frequently mentioned in the context of third-party computer parts, such as memory and hard drives.

=== Full warranty requirements ===
Under a full warranty, in the case of a defect, malfunction, or failure to conform with the written warranty, the warrantor:

- can remedy the consumer product within a reasonable time and without charge;
- may not impose any limitation on the duration of any implied warranty on the product;
- may not exclude or limit consequential damages for a breach of any written or implied warranty on the product, unless the exclusion or limitation conspicuously appears on the face of the warranty; and
- if the product, or a component part, contains a defect or malfunction, must permit the consumer to elect either a refund or replacement without charge, after a reasonable number of repair attempts.

In addition, the warrantor may not impose any duty, other than notification, upon any consumer, as a condition of securing the repair of any consumer product that malfunctions, is defective, or does not conform to the written warranty. However, the warrantor may require consumers to return a defective item to its place of purchase for repair.

== Limitations ==
The Magnuson–Moss Warranty Act does not invalidate or restrict any right or remedy of any consumer under any other federal law, nor does the act supersede the Federal Trade Commission Act as it pertains to antitrust actions.

The act does not invalidate or restrict any right or remedy of any consumer under state law. The act is not the dominant regulation of consumer product warranties, and while it prescribes certain disclosures and restricts certain limitations on warranties, it leaves other warranty law untouched.

Although the act covers warranties on repair or replacement parts in consumer products, warranties on services for repairs are not covered.

The federal minimum standards for full warranties are waived if the warrantor can show that the problem associated with a warranted consumer product was caused by damage while in the possession of the consumer, or by unreasonable use, including a failure to provide reasonable and necessary maintenance.

The act does not cover products not purchased by consumers. A microcomputer, for example, is only covered if intended for personal use.

== Remedies under the Act ==
The Act is meant to provide consumers with access to reasonable and effective remedies where there is a breach of warranty on a consumer product. The act provides for informal dispute-settlement procedures and for actions brought by the government and by private parties.

The FTC has been mandated by Congress to promulgate rules to encourage the use of alternative dispute resolution, and full warranties may require mediation and/or arbitration as a first step toward settling disputes. According to the United States Court of Appeals for the Ninth Circuit, though, in the 2011 case Kolev v. Porsche Cars North America, pre-dispute mandatory arbitration agreements are banned under Magnuson-Moss, citing the MMWA's enactment after the Federal Arbitration Act and the FTC's actions against pre-dispute arbitration agreements. However, the Ninth Circuit withdrew that decision on April 11, 2012, stating, its 2011 decision "may not be cited as precedent by or to this court or any district court of the Ninth Circuit." See Kolev v. Euromotors W./The Auto Gallery, 676 F.3d 867 (9th Cir. 2012).

In addition, the federal government has the authority to take injunctive action against a supplier or warrantor who fails to meet the requirements of the Act.

Finally, consumers may seek redress in the courts for alleged violations of the Magnuson–Moss Act. A consumer who has been injured by a supplier's noncompliance may bring an action in federal court if the amount in controversy is over $50,000 or a class action if the number of class plaintiffs is greater than 100. If the jurisdictional amount, or number of plaintiffs, does not meet these thresholds, an action under the Act may be brought only in state court. Moreover, one of the key aids to the effectiveness of the Act is that a prevailing plaintiff may recover reasonable costs of suit, including attorney fees.

== Impact and later developments ==
In 2019, the Federal Trade Commission (FTC) conducted a public workshop to solicit insights on contemporary warranty issues and repair restrictions relating to the Act.

In 2024 the FTC sent warning letters to eight companies -- notably four of them air purifier sellers -- about their warranty practices that inhibit consumers' right to repair products they have purchased. The letters illuminated concerns that the companies' practices violate the Magnuson-Moss Warranty Act.

Critics have argued that the Act largely failed to achieve its goals, and that since its passage warranties have become longer, substantively less protective, and much harder to read. Authors also note that the Act's goal of segmenting consumer warranties into "limited" and "full" (and relying on competitive pressure to provide full warranties) did not succeed, as nearly all products have limited warranties.

== See also ==
- Lemon law
- Repairability
- Specialty Equipment Market Association
- Warranty claim

== Sources ==
- American Jurisprudence, 2nd
- Federal Trade Commission
- 15 U.S.C. § 2301 et seq.
- 16 Code of Federal Regulations 700
- House Report No. 93-1606, 93d Cong 2d Sess.
- Davis v. Southern Energy Homes, Inc. 305 F.3d 1268 (11th Cir. 2002).
- Richardson v. Palm Harbor Homes, Inc., 254 F.3d 1321, 45 U.C.C. Rep. Serv. 2d 56 (11th Cir. 2001).
- Najran Co. for General Contracting and Trading v. Fleetwood Enterprises, Inc., 659 F. Supp. 1081 (S.D. Ga. 1986).
