= Directive (EU) 2024/2853 =

The Directive (EU) 2024/2853 of the European Parliament and of the Council of 23 October 2024 on liability for defective products and repealing Council Directive 85/374/EEC is a European directive on consumer protection and product liability. The Directive was published on the 18 November 2024 and took effect 20 days after its publication. EU member states now have 24 months, until 9 December 2026, to incorporate it into their national laws.

== Scope ==
Compared to the previous product liability directive from 1985, the scope of the products covered was expanded, and now includes components of products as well as software:

"'Product' means all movables, even if integrated into, or inter-connected with, another movable or an immovable; it includes electricity, digital manufacturing files, raw materials and software."

== See also ==
- Artificial Intelligence Act
- Cyber Resilience Act
