= General Product Safety Regulations 2005 =

United Kingdom product safety legislation

- Statutory Instrument
- Parliament of the United Kingdom
- Citation: SI 2005/1803
- Introduced by: Gerry Sutcliffe Department of Trade and Industry
- Territorial extent: United Kingdom

Dates
- Made: 30 June 2005
- Laid before Parliament: 6 July 2005
- Commencement: 1 October 2005
Other legislation
Repeals/revokes	General Product Safety Regulations 1994
Made under	European Communities Act 1972

Status: Current legislation

Text of statute as originally enacted

Text of the General Product Safety Regulations 2005 as in force today (including any amendments) within the United Kingdom, from legislation.gov.uk.

The General Product Safety Regulations 2005 (SI 2005/1803) is a statutory instrument of the Parliament of the United Kingdom that demands that "No producer shall [supply or] place a [consumer] product on the market unless the product is a safe product" (reg. 5(1)) and provides broad enforcement powers. The regulations implemented European Union directive 2001/95/EC and revoked the General Product Safety Regulations 1994 (SI 1994/2328) (reg. 1(2)). The regulations also repealed section 10 of the Consumer Protection Act 1987 which had previously imposed a more limited general safety requirement (reg. 46(2)).

It is a crime to breach the general safety requirement. On summary conviction in a magistrates' court, an offender can be sentenced to up to three months' imprisonment and the statutory maximum fine. On conviction on indictment in the Crown Court, an offender can be sentenced to 12 months' imprisonment and a £20,000 fine (reg. 20(1)). An enforcement authority can recover the full costs of enforcement from an offender (reg. 27).

It is a defence that all due diligence was exercised in the supply of the product (reg. 29(1)). Where a person wishes to rely on the defence that supply of a dangerous product was due to the default of someone else or reliance on information from someone else, he must serve notice on the court seven days before the hearing (reg. 29(2)–(3)).

== The general safety requirement ==
The regulations require that no producer shall (reg. 5):

- Place a product on the market;
- Offer or agree to place a product on the market or expose or possess a product for placing on the market;
- Offer or agree to supply a product or expose or possess a product for supply;
- Supply a product;

– unless the product is a safe product.

A producer must provide appropriate information to consumers (reg. 7). Either a producer or distributor must inform an enforcement authority if they become aware that they have supplied a dangerous product (reg. 9). The authority must inform the Secretary of State, as of 2008 the Secretary of State for Business, Enterprise and Regulatory Reform, who must inform the European Commission (regs. 33–34)

A distributor must exercise due care in helping to ensure safety through (reg. 8):

- Not selling dangerous products;
- Providing information to purchasers;
- Maintaining traceability;
- Co-operating with enforcement authorities.

=== Producer ===
A producer is (reg. 2):

- The manufacturer of a product who is established in the EU;
- A person established in the EU, holding himself out as the manufacturer, for example by selling private label products under his own brand ("own-branders");
- A person established in the EU who reconditions the product;
- A person established in the EU who represents a manufacturer from outside the EU;
- Where there is no EU representative of the manufacturer, the importer into the EU;
- Other professionals in the supply chain who affect the safety of the product.

A supply chain professional whose activity does not affect product safety is a distributor (reg. 2).

=== Product ===
The regulations apply to products supplied commercially, whether or not for consideration, that are (reg. 2):

- Consumer products; or
- Likely, under reasonably foreseeable conditions, to be used by consumers;

– including products that are:

- New, used or reconditioned;
- Made available for consumer for their own use during providing a service, for example hire of bowling shoes.

The regulations do not apply to products used by service providers themselves, especially means of transport (reg. 2), nor do they apply to second hand goods supplied with the clear intention that they will be repaired or reconditioned before use (reg. 4). They do not apply to products where there are specific provisions as to the product's safety in the law of the European Union (reg. 3).

=== Safe product ===
A safe product is a product which, under normal or reasonably foreseeable conditions of use including (reg. 2):

- Duration of use;
- Putting into service;
- Installation; and
- Maintenance requirements;

– does not present any risk or only the minimum risks compatible with the product's use, considered to be acceptable and consistent with a high level of protection for the safety and health of persons.

Relevant factors are (reg. 2):

- Characteristics of the product, including:
  - Composition;
  - Packaging; and
  - Instructions for assembly, installation and maintenance;
- Effect on other products, where it is reasonably foreseeable that it will be used with other products;
- Presentation, labelling, warnings, instructions for use and disposal and any other indication or information regarding the product; and
- Categories of consumers at risk when using the product, in particular children and the elderly;

– and conformance to or compliance with (reg. 6(3)):

- A voluntary UK standard giving effect to a European standard, but not a European standard published in the Official Journal of the European Union;
- Other UK standards;
- Recommendations of the European Commission setting guidelines on product safety assessment;
- Product safety codes of good practice in the sector concerned;
- The state of the art and technology; and
- Reasonable consumer expectations concerning safety.

A product that is not a safe product is a dangerous product. A product is not dangerous solely because other products are safer or it was feasible to make the product itself safer (reg. 2).

=== Products deemed safe by conformity ===
Products are deemed safe products where they conform to:

- UK safety legislation where there is no EU legislation (reg. 6(1)); or
- A voluntary UK standard that gives effect to a European standard that itself has been published in the Official Journal (reg. 6(2)).

=== Antiques ===
A supplier has a defence where (reg. 30):

- The product is second hand goods;
- The product is an antique;
- The supplier sells the product, rather than supplying it for use on some other basis; and
- The supplier informs the purchaser that the product is an antique.

== Enforcement ==
=== Enforcement authorities ===
Enforcement authorities that have a duty to enforce the regulations are (reg. 10):

- England:
  - county councils;
  - district councils;
  - London borough councils;
  - the Common Council of the City of London, in its capacity as a local authority;
  - the Council of the Isles of Scilly;
- Scotland:
  - councils for a local government area;
- Wales:
  - county councils or County Borough Councils.
- Northern Ireland:
  - district councils.

Enforcement authorities must act proportionately and encourage voluntary action but may take urgent action in the case of a serious risk (reg. 10(5)). They have the power to make test purchases (reg. 21) and powers of entry and search (regs. 22–23, 25–27). Authorities must undertake market surveillance (reg. 36) and make information available to the public (reg. 39) It is a crime to obstruct an officer of an enforcement authority, punishable on summary conviction to a fine of up to level 5 on the standard scale, i.e. £2,500 (reg. 24(1)).

=== Safety notices ===
An enforcement authority may serve a safety notice, in one of the following forms:

- a suspension notice preventing marketing or sale of the goods while safety evaluations, checks and controls are performed (reg. 11);
- a requirement to mark to ensure an adequate safety marking (reg. 12);
- a requirement to warn to issue a warning about a dangerous product to past and future consumers;
- a withdrawal notice to withdraw a dangerous product from the market and, possibly, to warn past consumers (reg. 14);
- a recall notice to recall a dangerous product (reg. 15).

The Secretary of State can require information or a product sample from a producer and it is a crime not to comply unless the information is protected by legal professional privilege or the right to silence (reg. 43).

Appeal against a notice can be made to a magistrates' court in England and Wales, and Northern Ireland, and to a sheriff in Scotland (reg. 17).

Breach of a safety notice is a crime and, on summary conviction, an offender can be sentenced to up to three months' imprisonment and the statutory maximum fine (which is unlimited in England and Wales since 2015). On conviction on indictment, an offender can be sentenced to 12 months' imprisonment and a £20,000 fine (s. 20(4)).

=== Forfeiture ===
In the case of prosecution for a breach of the regulations or an appeal against a safety notice in England and Wales and Northern Ireland, the enforcement authority may apply to the court for forfeiture of the product. Appeal is to the Crown Court (England and Wales) or to a county court (Northern Ireland) (reg. 18). In Scotland, application must be made to a procurator fiscal with appeal to the High Court of Justiciary (reg. 19).

== Further decisions under the Directive ==
Art.13 of the directive gives the European Commission the power to issue further decisions with which the Secretary of State must comply (reg. 35).

== Effect of Brexit ==
Using powers under the European Union (Withdrawal) Act 2018, the regulations were extensively amended to remove most references to the EU by the Product Safety and Metrology etc. (Amendment etc.) (EU Exit) Regulations 2019 (SI 2019/696), which came into force at 11 pm on 31 January 2020. In particular:

- "The market", which previously meant the EU single market, includes only Great Britain, as a consequence of the Northern Ireland Protocol, under which Northern Ireland remains part of the EU customs area and EU law relating to free movement of goods continues to apply.
- References to Member States are mostly replaced with references to the UK.
- Where the European Commission had a role previously, that role is taken up by the Secretary of State instead.
- The requirement to notify the Secretary of State and the Commission is replaced with a requirement to create a database of notifications to the EU under the market surveillance regulations, which serves as a way to notify the Secretary of State.
- The Secretary of State is no longer required to cooperate with the Commission on marketing of chemical substances and on enforcement arrangements. UK enforcement authorities are likewise no longer required to cooperate with enforcement authorities of EU member states.
- All references to the EU General Product Safety Directive are removed.

== Bibliography ==
- "The General Product Safety Regulations 2005 - Notification guidance for producers and distributors" (PDF). Department of Trade and Industry. September 2005. Archived from the original (PDF) on 11 October 2007., URN 05/1457
- Department of Trade and Industry (June 2005). "Government Response to the Consultation on proposals to implement Directive 2001/95/EC on general product safety (GPSD)" (PDF). Archived from the original (PDF) on 1 October 2011.
- "The General Product Safety Regulations 2005 - Guidance for businesses, consumers and enforcement authorities" (PDF). August 2005. Archived from the original (PDF) on 6 October 2007.
- Office of Public Sector Information (2005). "General Product Safety Regulations 2005 - explanatory notes". The Stationery Office.
