= Express warranty =

Type of warranty created based on a statement by the seller

An express warranty is created when a seller makes a guarantee to the buyer that the product/service being offered has certain qualities. Presenting an express warranty to a customer could potentially give rise to a product liability claim towards the company due to a marketing defect.

== Requirements ==
For an express warranty to exist between a seller and a buyer, the following must occur.

- First, a statement must be made. This statement could be made by making a promise with the buyer about the product/service being offered, giving the buyer a description of the product/service being offered, or by providing the buyer with a sample of the product/service being offered. Advertisements can also be used as a medium in which express warranties can be created. For there to be an express warranty the seller does not have to express that he/she is making a guarantee or warranty; as long as what is being said is a factual statement and as long as the buyer relied on the facts when deciding to make the purchase, then there exists an express warranty. However, there is no warranty if the seller is simply sharing his thoughts over the product/service that is being offered. Giving an opinion rather than a factual statement; a statement formed subjectively rather than objectively, is known as puffing. The act of puffery does not set the grounds for the creation of an express warranty.
- Second, the buyer must have depended on this guarantee (in whichever form it was made) when deciding whether or not to purchase the product/service. If a buyer believes that the product or service purchased does not resemble that which was expressed in the guarantee then the buyer has the option to file for a breach of express warranty. A seller could try to prove that the statements that were made did not play a role in the buyer's decision-making process.

Under the federal Magnuson–Moss Warranty Act, passed by Congress in 1975, the seller must provide a written express warranty that the product will be as demonstrated by the company. Any product above US$15 is eligible for written express warranty.

There is no requirement on how the warranty should be expressed and it can be written in many different ways.

Most of the express warranty are given by the manufacturer. Example:

A buyer wants to purchase a machine from Company X that he/she needs in order to get a specific job done. A Company X representative hands the buyer a brochure with details on a specific machine; the brochure states how this particular machine is capable of getting the buyers desired job done. Additionally, the representative orally confirms that what is being stated in the brochure is true; these affirmations led the buyer to purchase the machine. However, after purchase, the buyer faced problems with the machine. The product failed to meet the promises made by both the company brochure and the company representative.

In the scenario pictured above, there is an express warranty given the fact that 1) the company representative guaranteed that the product had a certain ability and that 2) the buyer relied on this guarantee when making the decision to purchase. Therefore, the buyer could sue for breach of express warranty and could also file a product liability claim.
