= Consumer protection =

Protection of consumers against unfair practices

Consumer protection is the practice of safeguarding buyers of goods and services, and the public, against unfair practices in the marketplace. Consumer protection measures are often established by law. Such laws are intended to prevent businesses from engaging in fraud or specified unfair practices to gain an advantage over competitors or to mislead consumers. They may also provide additional protection for the general public which may be impacted by a product (or its production) even when they are not the direct purchaser or consumer of that product. For example, government regulations may require businesses to disclose detailed information about their products—particularly in areas where public health or safety is an issue, such as with food or automobiles.

Consumer protection is linked to the idea of consumer rights and to the formation of consumer organizations, which help consumers make better choices in the marketplace and pursue complaints against businesses. Entities that promote consumer protection include government organizations (such as the Federal Trade Commission in the United States), self-regulating business organizations (such as the Better Business Bureaus in the US, Canada, England, etc.), and non-governmental organizations that advocate for consumer protection laws and help to ensure their enforcement (such as consumer protection agencies and watchdog groups).

A consumer is defined as someone who acquires goods or services for direct use or ownership rather than for resale or use in production and manufacturing. Consumer interests can also serve consumers, consistent with economic efficiency, but this topic is treated in competition law. Consumer protection can also be asserted via non-government organizations and individuals as consumer activism.

Efforts made for the protection of consumer's rights and interests include the right to:

- satisfaction of basic needs
- safety and health protection
- be informed
- choose and give consent
- be heard
- redress
- consumer education
- a healthy environment

== Consumer law ==
Consumer protection law or consumer law is considered as an area of law that regulates private law relationships between individual consumers and the businesses that sell those goods and services. Consumer protection covers a wide range of topics, including but not necessarily limited to product liability, privacy rights, unfair business practices, fraud, misrepresentation, and other consumer/business interactions. It is a way of preventing frauds and scams from service and sales contracts, eligible fraud, bill collector regulation, pricing, utility turnoffs, consolidation, personal loans that may lead to bankruptcy. There have been some arguments that consumer law is also a better way to engage in large-scale redistribution than tax law because it does not necessitate legislation and can be more efficient, given the complexities of tax law.

=== Australia ===
In Australia, the corresponding agency is the Australian Competition & Consumer Commission or the individual State Consumer Affairs agencies. The Australian Securities & Investments Commission has responsibility for consumer protection regulation of financial services and products. However, in practice, it does so through privately run EDR schemes such as the Australian Financial Complaints Authority.

=== Brazil ===
In Brazil, consumer protection is regulated by the Consumer's Defense Code (Código de Defesa do Consumidor), as mandated by the 1988 Constitution of Brazil. Brazilian law mandates "The offer and presentation of products or services must ensure correct, clear, accurate and conspicuous information in the Portuguese language about their characteristics, qualities, quantity, composition, price, guarantee, validity and origin, among other data, as well as the risks they pose to the health and safety of consumers." In Brazil, the consumer does not have to bring forward evidence that the defender is guilty. Instead, the defense has to bring forward evidence that they are innocent. In the case of Brazil, they narrowly define what consumers, suppliers, products, and services are, so that they can protect consumers from international channels trade laws and protect them from negligence and misconduct from international suppliers.

=== Colombia ===
In Colombia, consumer protection is primarily governed by Law 1480 of 2011 (Estatuto del Consumidor), which replaced the previous consumer protection regime and established a comprehensive framework for the protection of consumers' rights. The law guarantees consumers the right to receive quality products and services, accurate information, effective warranties, and legal protection against abusive contractual clauses. Consumer protection in Colombia extends beyond physical products to cover the quality of service provision, including healthcare services. The Superintendencia de Industria y Comercio (SIC) is the main government authority responsible for enforcing consumer protection regulations. The SIC exercises jurisdictional functions, allowing it to adjudicate consumer protection claims directly, including warranty reimbursement proceedings, without requiring consumers to resort to ordinary courts. In addition to its jurisdictional role, the SIC holds the power to impose administrative sanctions on businesses that violate consumers' rights and to investigate unfair commercial practices.

=== European Union ===
Several regulations in the European Union are concerned with consumer protection, including the Regulation on general product safety (GPSR) and the Directive (EU) 2024/2853 on liability for defective products.

=== Germany ===
Germany, as a member state of the European Union, is bound by the consumer protection directives of the European Union; residents may be directly bound by EU regulations. A minister of the federal cabinet is responsible for consumer rights and protection (Verbraucherschutzminister). In the current cabinet of Friedrich Merz, this is Carsten Schneider.

When issuing public warnings about products and services, the issuing authority has to take into account that this affects the supplier's constitutionally protected economic liberty, see Bundesverwaltungsgericht (Federal Administrative Court) Case 3 C 34.84, 71 BVerwGE 183.

=== India ===
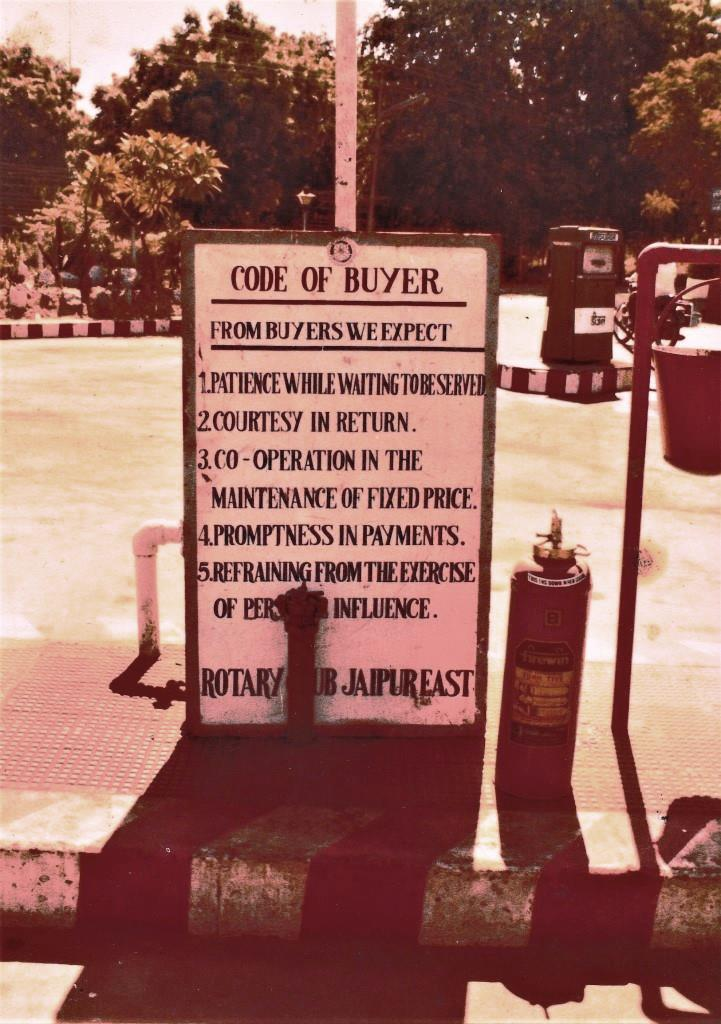
Sign showing Code of Buyers. Fuel outlet, Jaipur

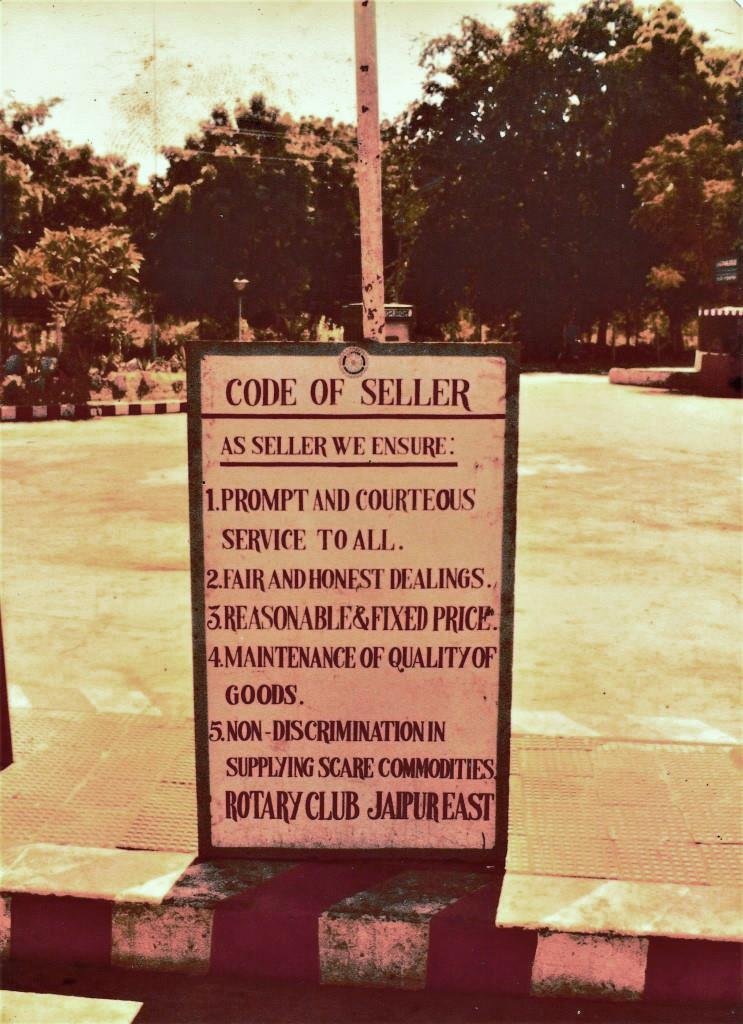
Code of Seller. Fuel outlet, Jaipur

In India, consumer protection is specified in The Consumer Protection Act, 2019. Under this law, Separate Consumer Dispute Redress Forums have been set up throughout India in every district in which a consumer can file their complaint on a simple paper with nominal court fees and their complaint will be decided by the Presiding Officer of the District Level. The complaint can be filed by both the consumer of a goods as well as of the services. An appeal could be filed to the State Consumer Disputes Redress Commissions and after that to the National Consumer Disputes Redressal Commission (NCDRC). The procedures in these tribunals are relatively less formal and more people-friendly and they also take less time to decide upon a consumer dispute when compared to the years-long time taken by the traditional Indian judiciary. In recent years, many effective judgments have been passed by some state and National Consumer Forums.

Indian Contract Act, 1872 lays down the conditions in which promises made by parties to a contract will be legally binding on each other. It also lays down the remedies available to the aggregate party if the other party fails to honor their promise.

The Sale of Goods Act of 1930 provides some safeguards to buyers of goods if goods purchased do not fulfill the express or implied conditions and warranties.

The Agriculture Produce Act of 1937 act provides grade standards for agricultural commodities and livestock products. It specifies the conditions which controls the use of standards and lays down the procedure for grading, marking, and packaging of agricultural produce. The quality mark provided under the act is known as AGMARK-Agriculture Marketing.

=== Nigeria ===
The Nigerian government must protect its people from any form of harm to human health through the use and purchase of items to meet daily needs. In light of this, the Federal Competition and Consumer Protection Commission (FCCPC), whose aim is to protect and enhance consumers' interest through information, education, and enforcement of the rights of consumers was established by an Act of Parliament o promote and protect the interest of consumers over all products and services. In a nutshell, it is empowered to eliminate hazardous & substandard goods from the market. Provide speedy redress to consumer complaints and petition arisen from fraud, unfair practice, and exploitation of the consumer.

On 5 February 2019, the President of Nigeria, Muhammadu Buhari, assented to the new Federal Competition and Consumer Protection Commission Bill, 2018. Thus, the bill became a law of the Federal Republic of Nigeria and binding on entities and organizations so specified in the Act.

The long title of the Act reads: "This Act establishes the Federal Competition and Consumer Protection Commission and the Competition and Consumer Protection Tribunal for the promotion of competition in the Nigerian market at all levels by eliminating monopolies, prohibiting abuse of dominant market position and penalizing other restrictive trade and business practices." The Act further repealed the hitherto Nigerian Consumer Protection Council Act and transferred its core mandate to the new Commission.

=== Taiwan ===
Modern Taiwanese law has been heavily influenced by the European civil law systems, particularly German and Swiss law. The Civil Code in Taiwan contains five books: General Principles, Obligations, Rights over Things, Family, and Succession. The second book of the Code, the Book of Obligations, provided the basis from which consumers could bring product liability actions prior to the enactment of the CPL.

The Consumer Protection Law (CPL) in Taiwan, as promulgated on 11 January 1994, and effective on 13 January 1993, specifically protects the interests and safety of customers using the products or services provided by business operators. The Consumer Protection Commission of Executive Yuan serves as an ombudsman supervising, coordinating, reporting any unsafe products/services, and periodically reviewing the legislation.

According to the Pacific Rim Law & Policy Association and the American Chamber of Commerce, in a 1997 critical study, the law has been criticized by stating that "although many agree that the intent of the CPL is fair, the CPL's various problems, such as ambiguous terminology, favoritism towards consumer protection groups, and the compensation liability defense, must be addressed before the CPL becomes a truly effective piece of legislation that will protect consumers"

=== United Kingdom ===
The main consumer protection laws in the UK are the Consumer Protection Act 1987 and the Consumer Rights Act 2015.

The United Kingdom has left the European Union, but during the transition period (until end of 2020) the UK was still bound by directives of the European Union. Specifics of the division of roles between the EU and the UK are detailed here. Domestic UK laws originated within the ambit of contract and tort but, with the influence of EU law, it is emerging as an independent area of law. In many circumstances, where domestic law is in question, the matter is judicially treated as tort, contract, restitution or even criminal law.

Consumer protection issues were dealt with by the Office of Fair Trading before 2014. Since then, the Competition and Markets Authority has taken on this role.

=== United States ===
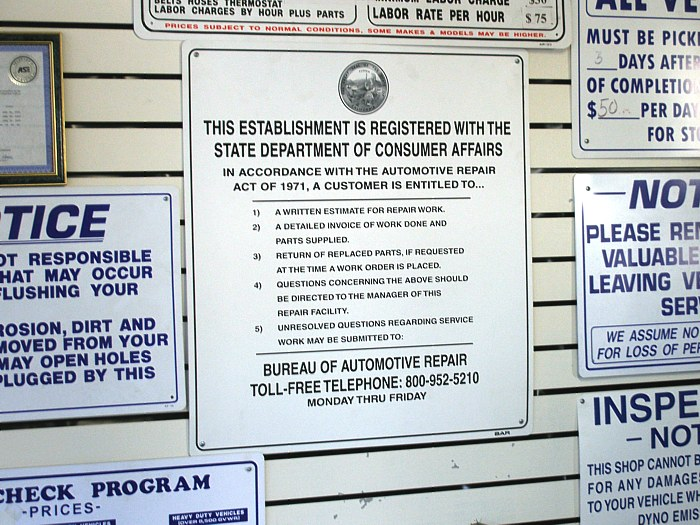
Consumer protection laws often mandate the posting of notices, such as this one which appears in all automotive repair shops in California.

In the United States a variety of laws at both the federal and state levels have regulated consumer affairs since the early 20th century. Among them are the Federal Food, Drug, and Cosmetic Act, Fair Debt Collection Practices Act, the Fair Credit Reporting Act, Truth in Lending Act, Fair Credit Billing Act, and the Gramm–Leach–Bliley Act. Federal consumer protection laws are mainly enforced by the Federal Trade Commission, the Consumer Financial Protection Bureau, the Food and Drug Administration, and the U.S. Department of Justice.

At the state level, many states have adopted the Uniform Deceptive Trade Practices Act including, but not limited to, Delaware, Illinois, Maine, and Nebraska. The deceptive trade practices prohibited by the Uniform Act can be roughly subdivided into conduct involving either a) unfair or fraudulent business practices and b) untrue or misleading advertising. The Uniform Act contains a private remedy with attorneys fees for prevailing parties where the losing party "willfully engaged in the trade practice knowing it to be deceptive". Uniform Act §3(b). Missouri has a similar statute called the Merchandising Practices Act. This statute allows local prosecutors or the Attorney General to press charges against people who knowingly use deceptive business practices in a consumer transaction and authorizes consumers to hire a private attorney to bring an action seeking their actual damages, punitive damages, and attorney's fees.

Also, the majority of states have a Department of Consumer Affairs devoted to regulating certain industries and protecting consumers who use goods and services from those industries. For example, in California, the California Department of Consumer Affairs regulates about 2.3 million professionals in over 230 different professions, through its forty regulatory entities. In addition, California encourages its consumers to act as private attorneys general through the liberal provisions of its Consumers Legal Remedies Act.

State and federal laws provide for "cooling off" periods giving consumers the right to cancel contracts within a certain time period for several specified types of transactions, potentially including transactions entered into at home, and warranty and repair services contracts.

Other states have been the leaders in specific aspects of consumer protection. For example, Florida, Delaware, and Minnesota have legislated requirements that contracts be written at reasonable readability levels as a large proportion of contracts cannot be understood by most consumers who sign them.

Considering the state of Massachusetts, the Massachusetts Consumer Protection Law, MGL 93A, clearly highlights the rights and violations of consumer protection law in the state. The chapter explains what actions are considered illegal under the law for which a party can seek monetary damages from the other party at fault. Some examples of practices that constitute a Chapter 93A violation would be when:

1. A Business charges a consumer higher rates than the marked price
2. The refund policy is not clearly posted where it can be readily noticed and understood
3. A business fails to tell you relevant information regarding your product or service misleads you in any way.

The laws under MGL 93A prohibit activities that relate to overpricing to a consumer and the use of "Bait and Switch" techniques. A court will award the plaintiff the damages if they can prove the (1) defendant knowingly and intentionally violated the MGL 93A agreement or (2) the defendant would not "grant relief in bad faith" knowing that the actions violated the MGL 93A agreement. Additionally, failure to disclose refund/ return policy, warranties, and critical information about the product/service are all in violation of the legislation, and can result in triple damages and lawyer fees.

== Laws ==
- Competition law

=== United Kingdom ===
- Consumer Protection (Distance Selling) Regulations 2000
- Consumer Rights Act 2015
- Electronic Commerce Regulations 2002
- Enterprise Act 2002
- General Product Safety Regulations 2005
- Sale and Supply of Goods to Consumers Regulations 2002/3045
- Supply of Goods (Implied Terms) Act 1973
- Supply of Goods and Services Act 1982
- Unfair Contract Terms Act 1977
- Unfair Terms in Consumer Contracts Regulations 1999

=== United States ===
- Consumer Product Safety Act – gives the Consumer Product Safety Commission the power to develop safety standards and pursue recalls for products
- Federal Trade Commission Act – created the Federal Trade Commission (FTC) to prevent unfair competition, deceptive acts, regulate trade, etc.

Privacy laws

- United States National Do Not Call Registry – allows US consumers to limit telemarketing calls they receive.

Food and drug

- Pure Food and Drug Act – led to the creation of the U.S. Food and Drug Administration (FDA) to regulate foods, drugs, and more.

Communications

- Communications Act of 1934 – created the Federal Communications Commission (FCC) to regulate all radio and interstate cable, phone, and satellite communications.

Banking

- Fair Credit Reporting Act (FRCA) – regulates the collection, dissemination, and use of consumer credit information
- Fair Debt Collection Practices Act (FDCPA) – eliminates abusive consumer practices, ensures fairness, etc.
- Truth in Lending Act (TILA) – requires clear disclosure of key terms of the lending arrangement and all costs.

Real estate

- Real Estate Settlement Procedures Act (RESPA) – prohibits kickbacks and requires lenders to provide a good faith estimate of costs

Health insurance

- Health Insurance Portability and Accountability Act (HIPAA) – provides consumer protection for health information

Digital media

- Digital Millennium Copyright Act – prohibits production or sale of devices or services intended to circumvent copyright measures.
- Digital Media Consumers' Rights Act (proposed) – would repeal the Digital Millennium Copyright Act

=== Australia ===
- The Australian Consumer Law
- Division 2 of Part 2 of the Australian Securities and Investments Commission Act 2001 about financial services and products.

== See also ==
=== Consumer issues ===
- Airline complaints
- Antitrust
- Better Business Bureau
- Cannabis rights
- Class action
- Competition policy
- Competition regulator
- Consumer complaint
- Consumer organization
- Consumers International
- Cooling-off period
- Credit and debt
- Easy-to-cancel mandate
- Extended warranty
- Fairtrade labelling
- Federal Trade Commission
- Food safety
- List of food labeling regulations
- Mandatory labelling
- Ombudsman
- Planned obsolescence
- Product recall
- Telephone Consumer Protection Act
- Transparency (market)
- Unfair competition

=== People ===
- Florence Kelley
- Ralph Nader
- Phil Radford
- Michael Vernon
