= Bezoar =

Mass found trapped in or adjacent to the gastrointestinal system

Bezoar stone
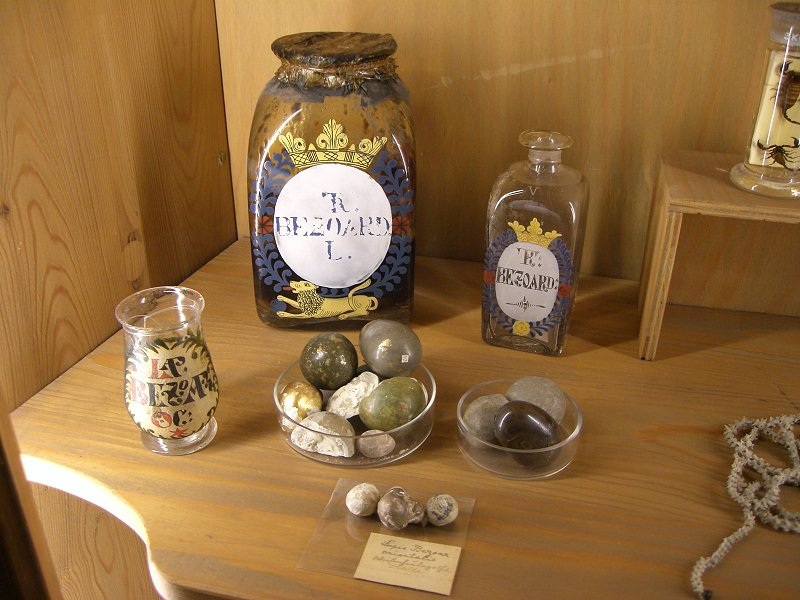
- Bezoar stones were seen as valuable commodities, sometimes with magical healing properties, as in the early modern English case Chandelor v Lopus.
- Pronunciation: /ˈbiːzɔːr/
- Specialty: Emergency medicine

A bezoar stone (/ˈbizɔːr/, BEE-zor) is a mass often found trapped in the gastrointestinal system, though it can occur in other locations. A pseudobezoar is an indigestible object introduced intentionally into the digestive system.

There are several varieties of bezoar, some of which have inorganic constituents and others organic. The term has both modern (medical, scientific) and traditional usage.

== Types ==
=== By content ===
- Food boluses (or boli; singular bolus) have the archaic and positive meaning of bezoar, and are composed of loose aggregates of food items such as seeds, fruit pith, or pits, as well as other types of items such as shellac, bubble gum, soil, and concretions of some medications.
- Lactobezoars are a specific type of food bezoar consisting of inspissated milk. It is most commonly seen in premature infants receiving formula foods.
- Pharmacobezoars (or medication bezoars) are mostly tablets or semiliquid masses of drugs, normally found following an overdose of sustained-release medications.
- Pseudobezoars are man-made ingestible, permeable, expandable implements that can swell in the stomach or in the intestines and stay inflated for a certain period of time, during which they perform particular functions, such as reducing gastric volume.
- Phytobezoars are composed of indigestible plant material (e.g., cellulose), and are frequently reported in patients with impaired digestion and decreased gastric motility.
- Diospyrobezoar is a type of phytobezoar formed from unripe persimmons. Coca-Cola has been used to treat them.
- Trichobezoar is a bezoar formed from hair – an extreme form of hairball. Humans who frequently consume hair sometimes require these to be removed. In cases of Rapunzel syndrome, surgery may be required.
- Ox bezoars (niu-huang (牛黃) or calculi bovis) are used in Chinese herbology to treat various diseases. They are gallstones or gallstone substitutes formed from ox or cattle bile.

=== By location ===
- A bezoar in the esophagus is common in young children and in horses; in horses, it is known as choke.
- A bezoar in the large intestine is known as a fecalith.
- A bezoar in the trachea is called a tracheobezoar.

== Cause ==
Esophageal bezoars discovered in nasogastrically fed patients on mechanical ventilation and sedation, are reported to be due to the precipitation of certain food types rich in casein, which are precipitated with gastric acid reflux to form esophageal bezoars. Bezoars can also be caused by gastroparesis and other systemic illnesses causing poor gastric motility, such as cystic fibrosis, due to delayed or incomplete gastric emptying, which allows food to form a bolus. Bezoars can also be caused or contributed to by poor mastication

The bezoar is typical composed of poorly digestible materials such as plant fibres, casein, medications or hair.

As such, bezoars can be common in individuals with trichophagia or pica.

Pharmacobezoars (bezoars caused by medication ingestion) form due to the ingestion and accumulation, in the stomach, of poorly digestible materials such as slow-release medication coatings or due to the pharmacological effects of ingested medications such as salicylates and often present with unique symptoms due to their contents

A 2013 review of three databases identified 24 publications presenting 46 patients treated with Coca-Cola for phytobezoars. Clinicians administered the cola in doses of 500 ml (18 imp fl oz; 17 US fl oz) to up to 3,000 ml (110 imp fl oz; 100 US fl oz) over 24 hours, orally or by gastric lavage. A total of 91.3% of patients had complete resolution after treatment with Coca-Cola: 50% after a single treatment, with others requiring cola plus endoscopic removal. Doctors resorted to surgical removal in four cases.

The Merck Manual of Diagnosis and Therapy notes that consumption of unripened persimmons has been identified as the main cause of epidemics of intestinal bezoars and that up to 90 percent of bezoars that occur from excessive consumption require surgery for removal.

== History ==
The word bezoar is derived from the Persian pād-zahr (پادزهر), literally 'antidote'. People believed that a bezoar had the power of a universal antidote and would work against any poison – a drinking glass that contained a bezoar could allegedly neutralize any poison poured into it. The myth of the bezoar as an antidote began in the Islamic world and India. Healers in these regions believed that bezoars had the ability to cure disease and overall protect the body, but most importantly, cure poison. Well-known Islamic physicians, such as Ibn Zuhr, played an important role in spreading this belief, where they describe bezoars as effective antidotes against poison.

Ibn Zuhr (d. 1161), known in the West as Avenzoar, is thought to have made the earliest description of bezoar stones as medicinal items. Extensive reference to bezoars also appears in the Picatrix.

In the Mongol Empire, bezoars were referred to as jada and were believed to be magical stones that could bring about storms when used in shamanic rituals. The Mongols likely inherited this practice from neighboring Turkic peoples, who called bezeors yat.

Through Arabic sources like medical texts and translation movements, bezoars were introduced into Europe in the 12th century. Later on, between the 16th and 17th centuries, bezoars became much more common across Europe due to the increase in global trade. Bezoars, along with other valuables like jewels and diamonds, were brought from India and the East Indies. Bezoars from monkeys and the goats in the East Indies were considered to be the most valuable and most effective antidotes to poison. During this time, bezoars were extremely popular due to new beliefs that the stone could also cure many other illnesses, such as plague, epilepsy, and melancholy, in addition to being a "cure-all" for poison.

Bezoars were important objects in Holy Roman Emperor Rudolf II's cabinets of curiosity and in natural-history collections, mainly for their use in early-modern pharmacy and in the study of animal health. Since bezoars began as extremely rare objects, they were mainly found in royal or elite collections, where they were treated as prized possessions and symbols of wealth rather than medicinal. Elites kept bezoars in their possession not only for bodily protection, but also to represent their wealth and rank. For example, Queen Elizabeth I of England wore a bezoar ring.

As bezoars were gaining more popularity in the 16th century, skepticism about their effectiveness increased. To prove the effectiveness of bezoars being able to cure poison, physicians conducted poison trials. In 1567, French surgeon Ambroise Paré did not believe that it was possible for the bezoar to cure the effects of any poison and described an experiment to test the properties of the stone. A cook in the King's court was sentenced to death and chose to be poisoned rather than hanged, under the condition that he would be given a bezoar after the poison. Paré administered the bezoar stone to the cook, but it had no effect, and the cook died in agony seven hours after taking the poison, proving that – contrary to popular belief – the bezoar could not cure all poisons.

As the demand and price of bezoars increased, counterfeit stones became a major issue. Because real bezoars were valuable and expensive, many traders began selling counterfeit stones, making it difficult to tell which stones were real. While poison trials were conducted to test the effectiveness of the stone, they were not always used to determine their authenticity. Instead, other tests included applying poison on a needle and passing it through a dog's leg, and if the dog survived, then the bezoar stone was considered to be real. The increasing skepticism, counterfeit stones, failed experiments, and advancements in medicine led to a decline in bezoars in Western medicine.

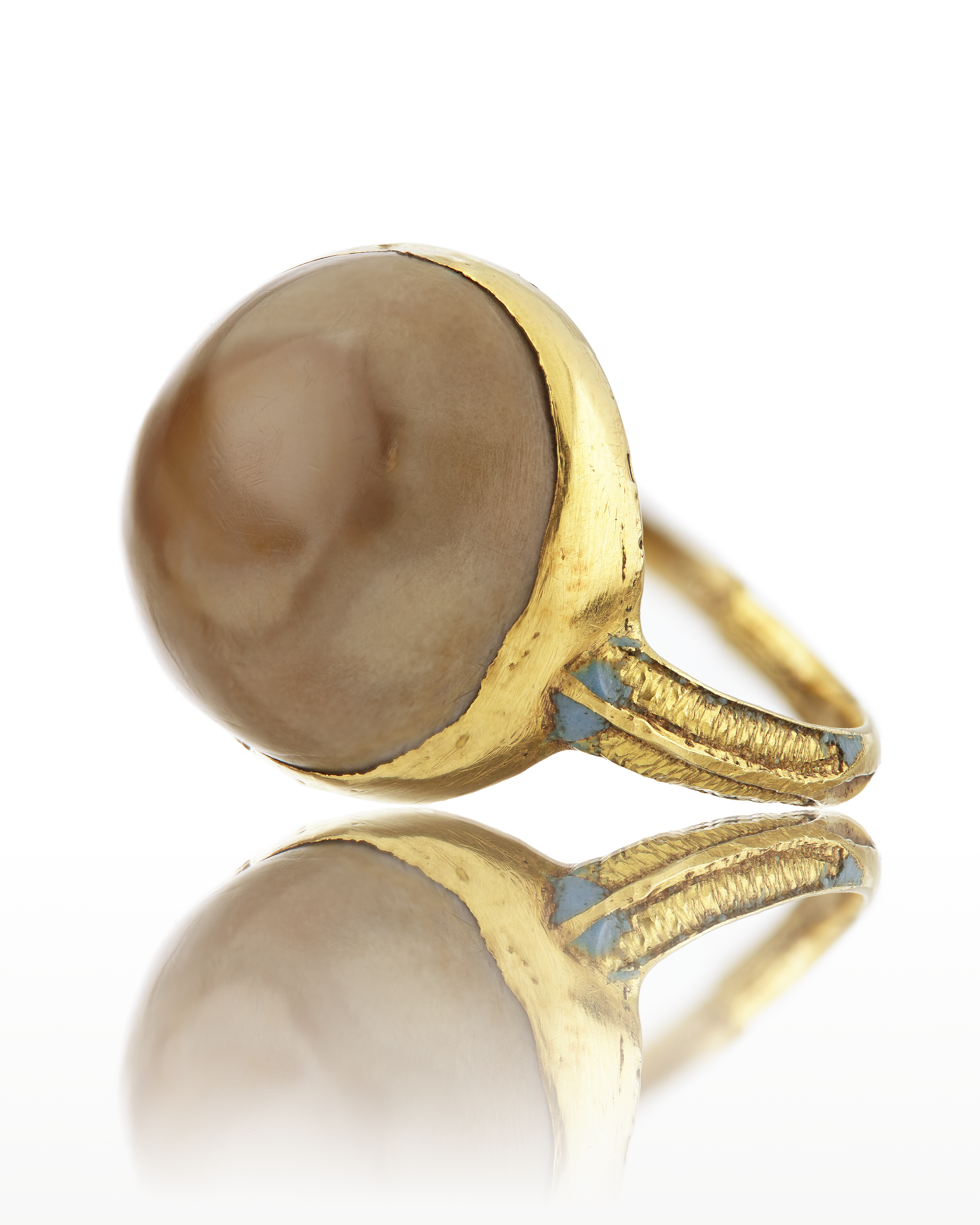
Finger ring with a bezoar stone, from 17th century

Modern examinations of the properties of bezoars by Gustaf Arrhenius and Andrew Benson of the Scripps Institution of Oceanography show that when bezoars are immersed in an arsenic-laced solution, they can remove the poison. The toxic compounds in arsenic are arsenate and arsenite; each is acted upon differently by the bezoars: arsenate is removed by being exchanged for phosphate in brushite found in the stones, while arsenite is bound to sulfur compounds in the protein of degraded hair, which is a key component in bezoars.

A famous case in the common law of England (Chandelor v Lopus, 79 Eng Rep. 3, Cro. Jac. 4, Eng. Ct. Exch. 1603) announced the rule of caveat emptor ("let the buyer beware") if the goods purchased are not in fact genuine and effective. The case concerned a purchaser who sued for the return of the purchase price of an allegedly fraudulent bezoar.

== See also ==
- Bezoardicum
- Coca-Cola treatment of phytobezoars
- Enterolith
- Fecalith
- Gastrolith
- Goa stone
- Gorochana
- Regurgitalith
- Snake-stones
- Toadstone

== Bibliography ==
- Barry Levine. 1999. Principles of Forensic Toxicology. Amer. Assoc. for Clinical Chemistry. ISBN 1-890883-87-5.
- Martin-Gil, F. J.; Blanco-Alvarez, J. I.; Barrio-Arredondo, M. T.; Ramos-Sanchez, M. C.; Martin-Gil, J. (11 February 1995). "Bézoard du jéjunum provoqué par une épluchure de pomme" [Jejunal bezoar caused by a piece of apple peel]. La Presse Médicale (in French). 24 (6): 326. PMID 7899397.
- This article incorporates text from a publication now in the public domain: Chambers, Ephraim (ed.). "Bezoar". Cyclopædia, or an Universal Dictionary of Arts and Sciences. James and John Knapton, et al.
