= Peachum =

Peachum may refer to:

- "Peachum wood" referenced in Seixas v. Woods

Two characters in drama:

- John Gay's The Beggar's Opera (1728)
- Bertolt Brecht and Kurt Weill's The Threepenny Opera (1928)
