= Seixas and Seixas v. Woods =

- Court: New York Supreme Court
- Full case name: Seixas and Seixas v. Woods
- Decided: May 1804
- Defendant: Woods
- Plaintiffs: Seixas and Seixas

Holding
- Judgment for defendant

Case opinions
- Decision by: Thompson Kent

Seixas & Seixas v. Woods 2 Cai. R. 48 (N.Y. Sup. Ct. 1804) was an 1804 American case which contributed to precedent around the doctrine of caveat emptor. The plaintiff Seixas & Seixas purchased wood from the defendant and alleged that he had been delivered a lower grade of wood than he had contracted to purchase.

== Summary ==
The defendant received wood from a house in New Providence, which he was the agent and in the invoice it was described as braziletto, but was actually "peachum wood", a wood of inferior quality. He advertised it as braziletto and sold it to had made out the bill of parcels as braziletto

and delivered it to the plaintiff. In the sales transaction neither side knew it to be other than braziletto, nor was any fraud imputed. There was no evidence of fraud or an express warranty. There was no expressed or implied warranty on the wood. Upon delivery plaintiff discovered the wood delivered was not braziletto and filed suit arguing that there was an implied warranty.

The court ruled in favor of the defendant and that he was not liable to a refund and has acted in good faith. There was no warranty or deceit, the purchaser purchases at his peril and should have taken more care in inspecting the wood. Mentioning the wood as braziletto in the bill of parcels and in the advertisement prior to the sale, did not amount to a warranty.

== Significance ==
Seixas v. Wood relies heavily on the English case of Chandelor v Lopus, and is the American counterpart to Chandelor in developing the rule "caveat emptor." Laidlaw v. Organ, an 1817 decision by Chief Justice John Marshall, is believed to have been the first U.S. Supreme Court case which laid down the rule of caveat emptor.
