= Furball =

Furball may refer to:

- An alternative term for hairball, an accumulation of hair in the digestive tract of an animal
- A large dogfight between groups of fighter aircraft
- Furball, a computer game released on the Commodore Amiga
- Furrball, a character from the cartoon Tiny Toon Adventures
- A term of endearment for a kitten or cat
