= Phytobezoar =

- Specialty: Gastroenterology, general surgery

A phytobezoar is a type of bezoar, or trapped mass in the gastrointestinal system, that consists of components of indigestible plant material, such as fibres, skins and seeds. While phytobezoars may be discovered incidentally on barium x-ray or endoscopic testing of the stomach, individuals with phytobezoars may develop symptoms: nausea, vomiting, gastric outlet obstruction, perforation, abdominal pain, and bleeding have been reported. Conditions that lead to decreased motility in the stomach (gastroparesis) and surgeries on the stomach (such as vagotomy or gastric bypass) are associated with the development of phytobezoars. A specific type of phytobezoar, termed a diospyrobezoar, is associated with ingestion of unripe persimmons, which contain a soluble tannin called shibuol that polymerizes into a coagulative cellulose-protein compound in the acid environment of the stomach, to form the bezoar. In addition to their presence in human stomachs, phytobezoars have been documented in the stomachs of slaughtered plant-eating animals.

== Cause ==
Gastric phytobezoars are a form of intestinal blockage and are seen in those with poor gastric motility. The preferred treatment of bezoars includes different therapies and/or fragmentation to avoid surgery. Phytobezoars are most common and consist of undigested lignin, cellulose, tannins, celery, pumpkin skin, grape skins, prunes, raisins, vegetables and fruits. Phytobezoars can form after eating persimmons and pineapples. These are more difficult to treat and are referred to as diospyrobezoars. Phytobezoars are more likely to form due to the ingestion of raw plant foods, even in persons without predisposing factors, as cooking softens them for easier digestion.

== Treatment ==
Several treatments for phytobezoars have been described. Endoscopy involves using a fibre-optic flexible camera to identify the phytobezoar, that can be evacuated from the stomach using various assisted devices (such as Roth baskets, snares, or Dormia baskets). If the phytobezoar cannot be removed due to size, electrohydraulic lithotripsy, mechanical lithotripsy, snares, or Nd:YAG laser therapy may be used to fragment the mass. Papain (meat tenderizer) and cellulase enzymes have been used to help reduce the size of phytobezoars. Carbonated soda ingestion has also been found to be useful to decrease the size of diospyrobezoars. A systematic review regarding initial treatment of phytobezoars with Coca-Cola found that Coca-Cola alone completely dissolved phytobezoars in half of cases, and that Coca-Cola combined with other endoscopic methods (particularly endoscopic fragmentation) was successful more than 90% of the time. The same review found that diospyrobezoars (which are considered more difficult to dissolve because of their hard consistency) were successfully treated with Coca-Cola alone in only 23% of cases, but that follow-up endoscopic fragmentation was successful in 84.6% of cases in the publications reviewed. When all other measures have failed, surgical gastrotomy is required to evacuate the bezoar.

== Physical and chemical properties ==
Generally, bezoars can be found in the stomach in less than 0.5% of patients having an esophagogastroduodenoscopy. The formation of diospyrobezoars from persimmons is due to a chemical reaction between stomach acid and phlobatannin contained in the persimmon. Tannin and shibuol found in the skin of unripe persimmons reacts with gastric acid and forms a coagulum. This structure then accumulates cellulose, hemicellulose and protein.
