= Trichophagia =

- Pronunciation: /traɪ.koʊˈfeɪ.gi.ə/
- Specialty: Psychiatry
- Symptoms: nausea, vomiting, abdominal pain, and hair loss
- Complications: Trichobezoar, Rapunzel syndrome

Trichophagia is a form of disordered eating in which persons with the disorder suck on, chew, swallow, or otherwise eat hair. The term is derived from ancient Greek θρίξ, thrix ("hair") and φαγεῖν, phagein ("to eat"). Tricho-phagy refers only to the chewing of hair, whereas tricho-phagia is ingestion of hair, but many texts refer to both habits as just trichophagia. It is considered a chronic psychiatric disorder of impulse control. Trichophagia belongs to a subset of pica disorders and is often associated with trichotillomania, the compulsive pulling out of ones own hair. People with trichotillomania often also have trichophagia, with estimates ranging from 48-58% having an oral habit such as biting or chewing (i.e. trichophagy), and 4-20% actually swallowing and ingesting their hair (true trichophagia). Extreme cases have been reported in which patients consume hair found in the surrounding environment, including other people's and animals' hair. In an even smaller subset of people with trichotillomania, their trichophagia can become so severe that they develop a hairball. Termed a trichobezoar, these masses can be benign, or cause significant health concerns and require emergency surgery to remove them. Rapunzel syndrome is a further complication whereby the hairball extends past the stomach and can cause blockages of gastrointestinal system.

Trichophagia occurs instinctively in many animal species and is not always a sign of a psychological disorder. Cats practice trichophagia as a form of regular grooming.

== Signs and symptoms ==
Signs and symptoms of trichophagia are variable depending on the individual's behavior patterns. Trichophagia's loosest definition is the putting of hair in one's mouth, whether that be to chew it or suck on it, with the strictest definition being that the hair is swallowed and ingested. Trichophagia is most closely associated with trichotillomania, the pulling out of one's own hair, and thus any symptoms of trichotillomania could be predictive of trichophagia and must be ruled out. Rarely, persons with trichophagia do not exclusively have trichotillomania and instead will eat the hair of others.

Trichotillomania can be categorized as either "automatic", where the hair pulling is so habitual it is almost unconscious, or "focused", where the pulling is more deliberate, with the focused behavior thought to be more common among those with trichophagia. Once the hair has been pulled out, persons with trichophagia might rub the hair against their lips, roll the hairs around and inspect them, bite off and swallow the bulb of the hair, or ingest the entire hair shaft as well. Typically, ingested hair remains asymptomatic and is not harmful. However, if trichophagia is severe or chronic, a large mass of undigested hair can accumulate in the stomach, resulting in a trichobezoar. This can be symptomatic, including nausea, vomiting, and abdominal pain. Once the trichobezoar grows large enough, it can extend beyond the stomach and lead to bowel obstructions, ulcers, perforations, acute pancreatitis and appendicitis (this is called Rapunzel syndrome).

Along with the physical harm caused by the pulling out and ingestion of hair, the unpleasant symptoms and social stigma surrounding trichophagia negatively affect the quality of life of sufferers, leading to shame, guilt, and impairment of social functioning. In one study, it was found that a significant percentage of patients with trichotillomania used drugs and alcohol to cope with negative feelings relating to pulling behaviors, with most sufferers reporting symptoms of anxiety and depression. It is important for physicians to recognize and treat these secondary symptoms in order to relieve hair-pulling and eating behaviors.

== Epidemiology ==
Trichophagia is estimated to have a prevalence of 0.6% in the general population with the most restrictive definition of hair ingestion, but looser definitions which are inclusive of sucking and chewing without swallowing, can be as high as 3.2%. Its prevalence among patients with trichotillomania is estimated to be around 37.5%, with 33% developing trichobezoars. Trichophagia can present at any age, with childhood cases typically being more common and of a more habitual nature, while in adulthood it is associated with underlying psychopathologies and more severe symptoms. Among childhood cases the distribution between males and females is equal. However, in adolescents and adults, trichophagia is increasingly common among females, with a distribution of cases of 15:1, female-to-male. Highest prevalence is in young adults.

Many of the prevalence rates are thought to be underestimates due to stigma and inconsistent definitions of trichophagia. Moreover, the discrepancy between rates in women and men could be explained by underreporting in men, either due to additional shame for men or the ease of shaving and hiding their underlying trichotillomania. Trichophagia in men, while more rarely reported, is often more severe.

== Etiology ==
Several etiological causes for trichotillomania and trichophagia have been hypothesized, suggesting that symptoms may be caused by disordered emotional regulation, autostimulation mechanisms, a response to stressors, behavioral conditioning, or addiction. Research has also shown that there is a genetic component to the disorders; trichotillomania patients are more likely to have relatives who suffer from obsessive-compulsive disorder, excoriation disorder, and major depressive disorder. Decreased distress tolerance and increased impulsivity were also found in trichotillomania patients with a family history of obsessive-compulsive disorder.

== Comorbid Psychopathologies ==
When assessing patients with trichophagia, common comorbid psychopathologies are anxiety disorders, eating disorders, depressive disorders, and addiction. More comorbid psychopathologies are associated with more severe symptoms of trichotillomania and trichophagia. The association between trichotillomania, obsessive-compulsive disorder, and related body-focused repetitive behaviors has been of particular interest to researchers, with studies finding that those with both trichotillomania and obsessive-compulsive disorder have higher levels of anxiety and depression as opposed to those who only suffer from trichotillomania. The commonality of comorbid psychopathologies in individuals with trichotillomania and trichophagia could be indirectly caused by the social rejection sufferers face due to their symptoms. Researchers suggest that bringing awareness of the disorders to the general population could help relieve the stigmas faced by patients.

== Diagnosis ==
Diagnosis of trichophagia can be difficult, as the behavior is easy to hide, and because of shame, individuals rarely admit they have trichophagia, even if they have stopped engaging in its related behaviors. Often, individuals only seek medical help after they have developed gastrointestinal problems caused by a trichobezoar. Any patient who has confirmed trichotillomania should be screened for trichophagia. Some symptoms, such as hair loss, can be caused by other somatic conditions, the presence of which needs to be excluded before a diagnosis of trichotillomania or trichophagia.

== Treatment ==
Psychotherapy has been widely used in the treatment of trichotillomania and trichophagia, with evidence supporting cognitive behavioral therapy, habit-reversal training, and mindfulness-based cognitive therapy as being effective treatments. The most commonly used clinical treatment is the prescription of selective serotonin uptake inhibitors (SSRIs), such as fluoxetine and clomipramine, but the effectiveness of this treatment has not been supported empirically. Evidence for efficacy has been found in studies using non-SSRIS, including N-acetylcysteine and olanzapine.

== Prognosis ==
Rapunzel syndrome, an extreme form of trichobezoar in which the "tail" of the hair ball extends into the intestines, and can be fatal if misdiagnosed. In some cases, surgery may be required to remove the mass. In one case, a trichobezoar weighing 4.5 kilograms (9.9 lb) was removed from the stomach of an 18-year-old woman with trichophagia.

== History ==
Trichophagia and trichobezoars have been documented by physicians for centuries, even long before a medical definition was established for trichotillomania. For example, in the 18th century, French doctor M. Baudamant described the condition in a 16-year-old boy. Trichophagia is most often covered in the medical literature only "as a rare symptom of trichotillomania."

Despite its appearance in medical literature over the centuries, little research was conducted on trichophagia until the past decade. Even now, most research focuses on Western cultures and European hair textures, with other groups with distinct hair textures, styles, and cultures, such as African Americans, often overlooked.

== In media ==
Trichophagia is mentioned in the 1000 Ways to Die episode "Stupid Is As Stupid Dies" featuring a young woman who died from it. It is also mentioned in Grey's Anatomy season 9 episode 11 "The End Is the Beginning Is the End". As well as Season 3 episode 16 of The Resident, "Reverse Cinderella."
