= Goa stone =

Artificial bezoar

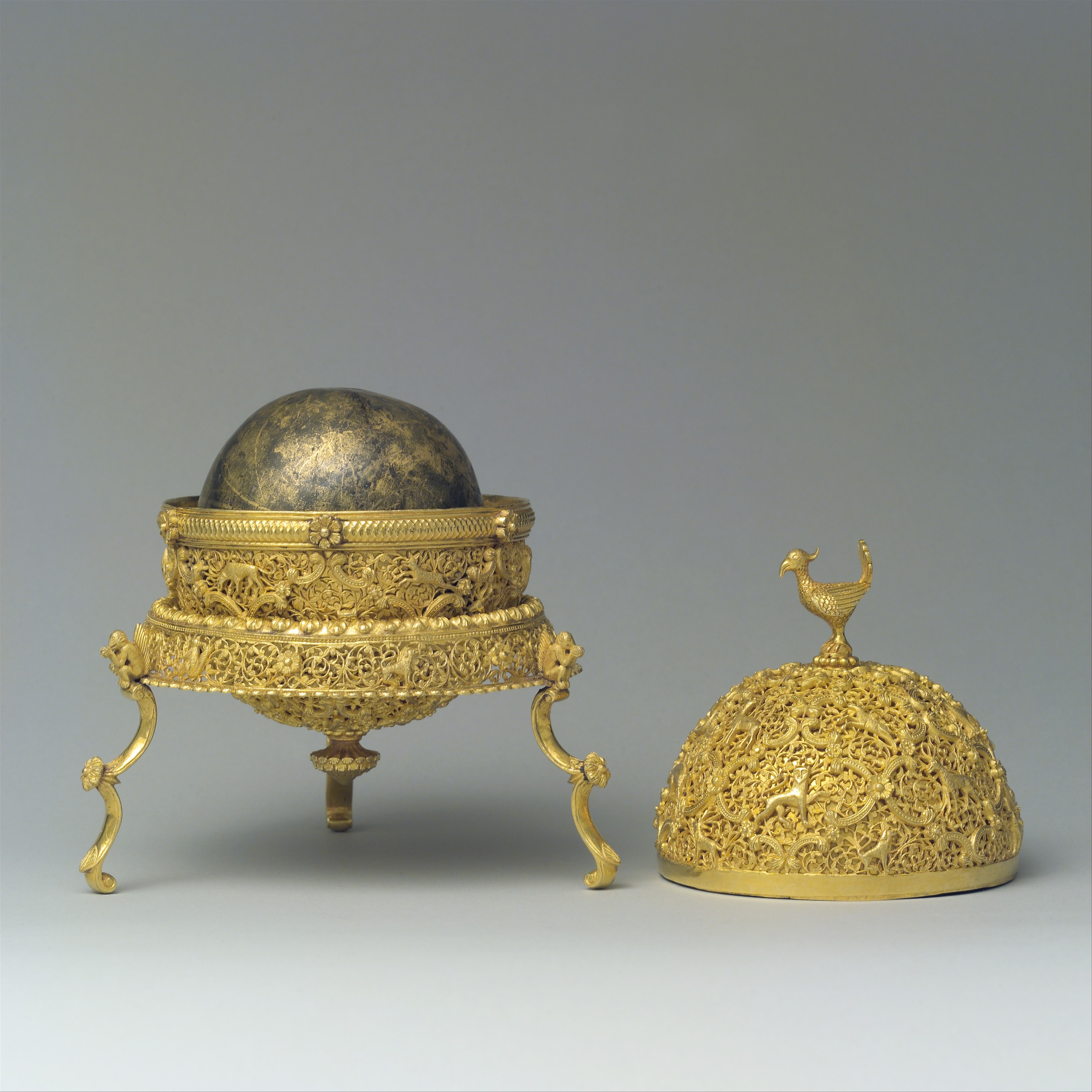
Goa Stone and container, probably from Goa, India, late 17th–early 18th century.

A Goa stone or Lapis de Goa was a man-made bezoar that was considered to have medicinal and talismanic properties. Goa stones were made in Goa, India and exported to apothecaries in Europe from the mid-16th to 18th century. Goa stones were manufactured by Jesuits in the late seventeenth century in Goa because naturally occurring bezoars were scarce. Their inventor was the Florentine lay brother Gaspar Antonio, and a Jesuit monopoly was confirmed by the Portuguese on March 6, 1691. They were created by combining organic and inorganic materials including hair, fossil shark teeth, shells, tusks, resin, and crushed gems, then shaping the materials into a ball and covering it with gilt. Like bezoar stones, Goa stones were thought to prevent disease and cure poisoning. They could be administered by shaving off small pieces into a drinkable beverage like water, tea, or wine.

After the death of Gaspar Antonio the recipe went to Father Jorge Ungarate. The Jesuits were forced to leave Goa in 1759 and these stones were then produced by Capuchin friars at the Convento da Madre de Deus until 1835. The secret recipe was then passed on to Manuel do Carmo Pacheco who produced the stones until his death in 1868.

The Goa stones, or Pedjra Cordial, as it appears from the Royal letter of the 21st March 1691, were the monopoly of the Jesuits, who not only sold them in India, but exported them to Portugal in large quantities and with great profit. After the death of Gaspar Antonio, these stones were manufactured by Jorge Ungarete, and subsequently by several Jesuit Fathers. Their composition is not exactly known, but it is said to have been much similar to that of the following formula:— Re. Coral branco, vermelho e pedra bezoar ana 2 one. Rubins, jacintos, topazios, saphiras e aljofar, ana 1 one. Esmeralda \ one. xlmbargriz e almiscar 2 escrop. Folhinhas de onro No. 4. Livro das Mon^oens, No. 56; p. 70, Archivo da Pharmacia, vol. I., p. 48.

The stones made their way to England as well and an early mention is made in 1686 by Gideon Harvey who was sceptical of the curative value noting that they were confected from a "jumble of Indian Ingredients" by "knavish Makers and Traffickers.'"

Goa stones were kept in ornate, solid gold or gilded cases that were believed to enhance the medicinal properties of the stones. The cases usually featured a busy network of filigree, occasionally adorned with ornaments of animals, including monkeys, unicorns, dogs, and parrots.
