= Integument =

Natural covering in biology

In biology, an integument is the tissue surrounding an organism's body or an organ within, such as skin, a husk, shell, germ or rind.

== Etymology ==
The term is derived from integumentum, which is Latin for "a covering". In a transferred, or figurative sense, it could mean a cloak or a disguise. In English, "integument" is a fairly modern word, its origin having been traced back to the early seventeenth century; and refers to a material or layer with which anything is enclosed, clothed, or covered in the sense of "clad" or "coated", as with a skin or husk.

== Botanical usage ==
In botany, the term "integument" may be used as it is in zoology, referring to the covering of an organ. When the context indicates nothing to the contrary, the word commonly refers to an envelope covering the nucellus of the ovule. The integument may consist of one layer (unitegmic) or two layers (bitegmic), each of which consisting of two or more layers of cells. The integument is perforated by a pore, the micropyle, through which the pollen tube can enter. It may develop into the testa (seed coat).

== Zoological usage ==
The integument of an organ in zoology typically would comprise membranes of connective tissue such as those around a kidney or liver. In referring to the integument of an animal, the usual sense is its skin and its derivatives: the integumentary system, where "integumentary" is a synonym of "cutaneous".

In arthropods, the integument, or external "skin", consists of a single layer of epithelial ectoderm from which arises the cuticle, an outer covering of chitin, the rigidity of which varies as per its chemical composition. The molting of this cuticle and growing of a larger one as part of their growth cycle is characteristic for arthropods, and ecdysozoa in general.

== Derivative terms and sundry usages ==
Derivative terms include various adjectival forms such as integumentary (e.g. system), integumental (e.g. integumental glands, "peltate glands, the integument being raised like a bladder due to abundant secretion") and integumented (as opposed to bare).

Other illustrative examples of usage occur in the following articles:

- Connective tissue in skeletal muscle
- Dorsal artery of the penis (example of integument enclosing an internal organ)
- Flensing
- Flesh (generic use of plural "integuments")
- Herzog & de Meuron (figurative usage)
- Integumentary system (senses related to vertebrate skin and medical aspects)
- Integumental muscles
- Mosasaur
- Seed
