= Carbonated soda treatment of phytobezoars =

Phytobezoar
- ICD-9-CM: 938
- MeSH: D001630
- MedlinePlus: 001582

Carbonated soda treatment of phytobezoars is the use of carbonated soda to try to dissolve a phytobezoar. Bezoars consist of a solid and formed mass trapped in the gastrointestinal system, usually in the stomach. These can also form in other locations.

Carbonated soda has been proposed for the treatment of gastric phytobezoars. In about 50% of cases studied, carbonated soda alone was found to be effective in gastric phytobezoar dissolution. Unfortunately, this treatment can result in the potential of developing small bowel obstruction in a minority of cases, necessitating surgical intervention. It is one of many other stomach disorders that can have similar symptoms.

Gastric phytobezoars are a form of intestinal blockage and are seen in those with poor gastric motility. The preferred treatment of bezoars includes different therapies and/or fragmentation to avoid surgery. Phytobezoars are most common and consist of various undigested substances including lignin, cellulose, tannins, celery, pumpkin skin, grape skins, prunes, raisins, vegetables and fruits. Phytobezoars can form after eating persimmons and pineapples. These are more difficult to treat and are referred to as diospyrobezoars.

== Treatment ==
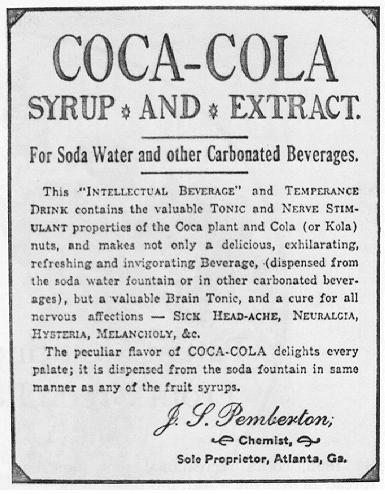
Other medicinal claims for Coca-Cola

Carbonated soda may help to dissolve phytobezoars. It can be given by a naso-gastric tube in children. Carbonated soda can also be given by mouth and during endoscopy. It is effective in about half of the cases.

It promotes dissolution by endoscopic techniques in the majority of the patients left, leading to a final success rate up to 91.3%. In some cases, regular use of Coca-Cola resulted in no recurrence 3–15 months after the first episode. Treatment has varied widely. Coca-Cola has been administered either as drinking beverage or as lavage. Some are treated with various combinations of drink, injection and irrigation. The volume of Coca-Cola in treatment varies along with daily dose and time of treatment. Dosages varied from 500 mL up to 3000 mL and treatment period 24 hours to 6 weeks. When lavage is used, a double-lumen nasogastric tube or two separate tubes using 3000 mL of Coca-Cola is administered during a 12-hour period. Alternative treatments are the use of cellulase, acetylcysteine, papain, pancreatic enzymes, saline solution, 0.1 N HCl and sodium bicarbonate. The protocol for the treatment of phytobezoars with Coca-Cola, i.e., dosage and timing, has not been standardized; further investigation has been encouraged.

== Contraindications ==
Trichobezoars do not respond to treatment with Coca-Cola but instead this type may have to be surgically removed. Persimmon diospyrobezoars sometimes are resistant to Coca-Cola and require a different treatment. This can include endoscopic fragmentation and/or surgical approaches especially in urgent cases where the patient exhibits gastrointestinal bleeding.

== Adverse effects and interactions ==
Adverse effects have been observed with the use of papain, including but not limited to a gastric ulcer, hyponatremia and oesophageal perforation. These effects have not been observed with the use of Coca-Cola. Glucose levels during the administration of Coca-Cola have not been addressed.

== Pharmacology and interactions ==
In addition to Coca-Cola, meat tenderizer has been used to dissolve bezoars of the stomach. When treatment with Coca-Cola is combined with endoscopic methods, the success of treatment approaches 90%. The mechanism by which Coca-Cola dissolves the bezoar is based upon its low pH, CO_{2} bubbles, and sodium bicarbonate content.

"...patients given a continuous infusion of Coca-Cola by nasogastric tube over 12 hours showed complete resolution of bezoars. If you cannot find a can of Coke, perhaps Pepsi will do the trick, assuming it does not cause dysPEPSIa."

Some clinicians have described the mode of interaction is based upon the acidification of the gastric contents and the release of CO_{2} that causes disintegration. Three and a half liters given nasogastrically over 12 hours has been found to dissolve these bezoars. Coca-Cola has a pH of 2.6. This is due to carbonic and phosphoric acid which resemble gastric acid. Gastric acid is believed to facilitate the digestion of fibers. In Coca-Cola, NaHCO_{3} has a mucolytic effect and CO_{2} bubbles enhance dissolving the bezoar. Coca-Cola reduces the size and softens the make-up of the bezoar, and combined with other treatments, enhances the dissolution.

== History ==
A phytobezoar was first successfully treated with Coca-Cola lavage in 2002.
