= Bezoardicum =

Term for multiple alchemical substances

Bezoardicum (bezoar of) is a term applied to multiple substances used in alchemy and other practices:

- Bezoardicum joviale, or bezoar of Jupiter, is a regulus made by melting three ounces of regulus of antimony and two of block tin. This is then powdered and mixed with six ounces of corrosive sublimate and distilled off in a kind of butter. It is then dissolved in spirit of nitre (nitric acid) and distilled three times. The bezoar remaining at the bottom is powdered, washed, and mixed with spirit of wine, until it grows insipid.
- Bezoardicum lunale, or bezoar of the Moon, is made by mixing eight ounces of rectified butter of antimony with one of fine silver. This is dissolved in spirit of nitre, by gently pouring it on till the ebullition ceases. The spirit is then drawn off by a gentle heat, and the bezoar managed as in the preparation of bezaordicum joviale.
- Bezoardicum martiale is a dissolution of Crocus Martis by reverberation in butter of antimony, with spirit of nitre poured on it. The rest is done according to the preparation of bezoardicum joviale.
