= Rapunzel syndrome =

Intestinal condition in humans resulting from ingesting hair

- Specialty: Psychiatry, gastroenterology

Rapunzel syndrome is an extremely rare intestinal condition in humans resulting from ingesting hair, which is often associated with the hair-pulling disorder trichotillomania. This syndrome occurs when a hairball, called a trichobezoar, extends in the form of a slim, tail-like segment past the small intestine, potentially reaching as far as the colon. The syndrome is named after the long-haired girl Rapunzel in the fairy tale by the Brothers Grimm. Since 1968, there have been fewer than 40 documented cases in the medical literature.

== Signs and symptoms ==
The use of the term 'Rapunzel syndrome' first appeared in the medical literature in 1968.

Characteristics of the syndrome include:

- The body of a trichobezoar located in the stomach, and its tail (hence the reference to Rapunzel in the syndrome's name) in the small bowel and/or in the right colon
- Small or large bowel obstruction
- Occurs as a complication of trichotillomania
- Abdominal pain
- Nausea and vomiting
- Gut perforation
- Vitamin B_{12} deficiency
- Acute pancreatic necrosis

== Cause ==
Rapunzel syndrome is caused by the ingestion of hair, typically as the result of the psychiatric disorder trichophagia. The affected individual compulsively plucks and swallows strands of their own hair. The human digestive system is unable to digest the swallowed hair; if the volume of hair thus consumed is low, then it will be passed through the gut system and excreted with solid waste or ejected as vomit. However, if the hair is not excreted by either means, it will begin to accumulate in the stomach. As it accumulates, a trichobezoar is formed, which increases the likelihood that additional swallowed hair will be trapped rather than passed. In most cases, the trichobezoar remains in the stomach; however, in rare cases the trichobezoar will extend further into the gastrointestinal system as it develops, thus comprising Rapunzel syndrome.

== Diagnosis ==
Trichobezoar can be preoperatively diagnosed. However, the diagnosis of the Rapunzel syndrome has to consider several aspects such as the patient's psychiatric history. This syndrome does not appear in the DSM-5, and will therefore not be given as such, but will have been diagnosed as severe trichotillomania. The syndrome itself is used to describe the manifestation of a trichobezoar which has extended far into the small intestine. It describes the trichobezoar, not the mental health disorder which precipitated it.

The diagnosis of the syndrome is also done by endoscopy. A CT scan is recommended to determine the size and the extension of the trichobezoar. Upper GI endoscopy is known as the gold standard for the diagnosis of a trichobezoar, however the endoscopy alone might not necessarily detect the co-existing Rapunzel syndrome.

== Treatment ==
Laparotomy has been identified as the standard treatment for Rapunzel syndrome. Because the human gastrointestinal tract is unable to digest human hair, the trichobezoar often has to be treated surgically; this involves removal of the mass by careful extraction from the stomach and duodenum. If the mass is small enough, it can be removed endoscopically. Once the mass surpasses greater than 20 centimeters, it must be removed by laparotomy. It is recommended that general anesthesia with intubation be used when removing the hairball in order to protect the throat from any damage. Patients usually also require psychiatric evaluation and treatment due to the association with impulse control disorders, especially trichotillomania. Long-term follow up as well as psychiatric consultation is also recommended to prevent the event from repeating.

== Outcomes ==
The expected outlook after surgical intervention is very promising. The success rate of removal of the mass is above 90% and the complication rate is only near 10%. Recurrence is highly uncommon but can occur if the patient does not follow up on psychological treatment or counseling.

== Epidemiology ==
Rapunzel syndrome is extremely rare, with fewer than 64 cases reported since 1968. It is mainly seen in emotionally or mentally disturbed young or adolescent females. The first known case dates back to a 16-year-old boy in 1779; this was eventually published by Vaughan et al. in 1968. Of the cases reported, the typical age range affected from this syndrome is between 4 and 19 years of age. There is no specific region that is subject to developing this condition, however of the cases reported all of the women came from countries where women traditionally had long hair. Women are more subject to this disorder because women often have longer hair than men. There is only one reported male case of Rapunzel syndrome, but he was eating his sister's hair and not his own.

== Research ==
Although this condition is extremely rare, researchers have mentioned that it is absolutely critical that prevention methods are taken after surgery. The most common reason for recurrence in patients is lack of follow-up care and incomplete psychological treatment.
