= Henry's pocket =

Fold of skin on the ear of certain mammals

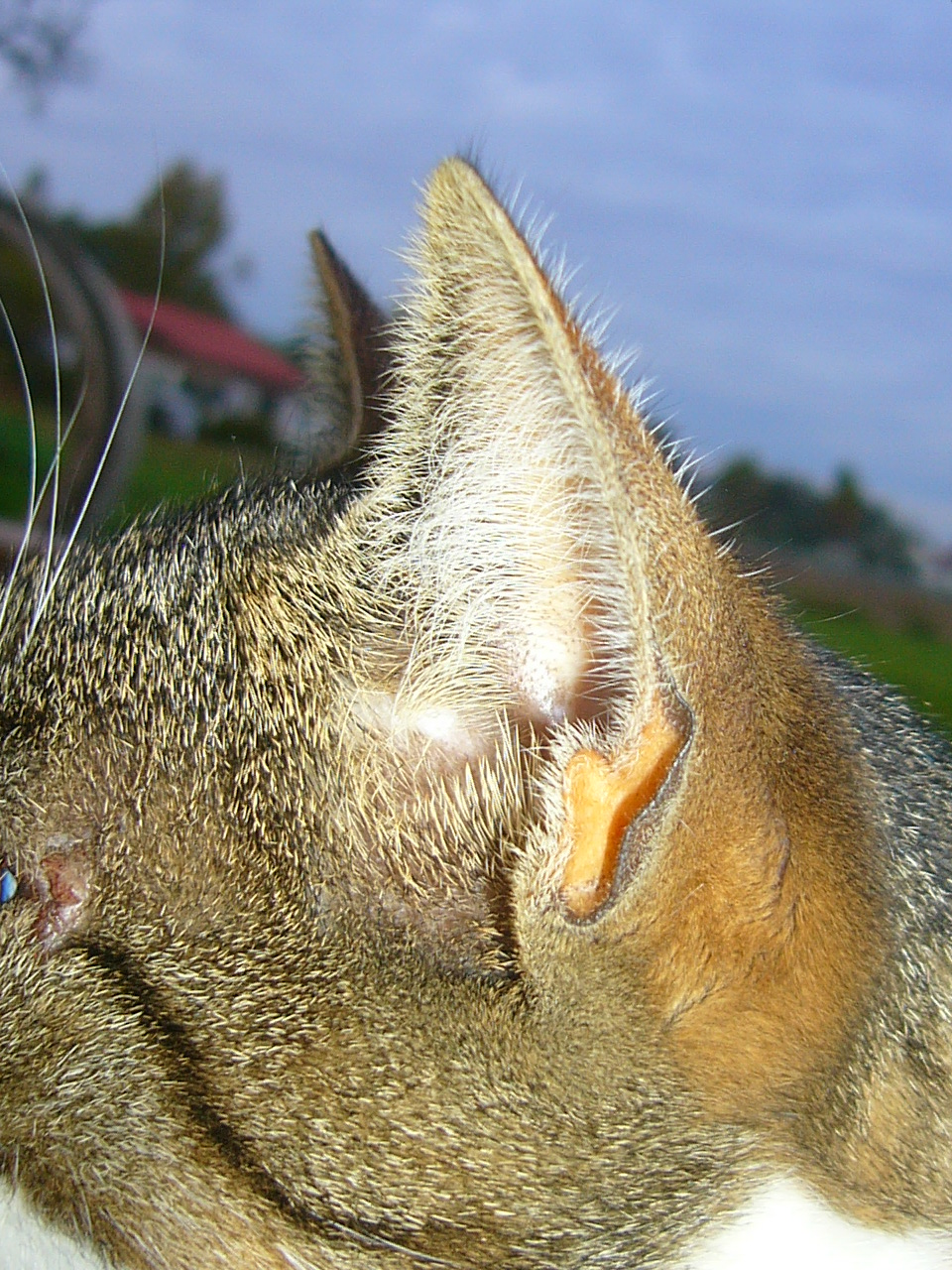
Prominent Henry's pocket of a domestic cat

In animal anatomy, Henry's pocket, more formally known as a cutaneous marginal pouch, is a fold of skin forming an open pouch on the lower posterior part of the external ear. The pocket is situated in the approximate location of the antitragus in the human ear. It occurs in a number of mammalian species, including weasels and bats, but is particularly noticeable on the domestic cat, as well as some dog breeds.

It is unknown where the name "Henry's pocket" came from. The earliest known use of the term appears to be from the book Living Creatures of an English Home (1971) by Olive Royston, although the author's tone indicates the term was already in use, and already of unknown origin.

The pocket is of unknown function, and it is unclear if it has any. However, one hypothesis is that it aids in the detection of high-pitched sounds by attenuating lower pitches, especially when the ear is angled, common for a predator when hunting. Since the pocket occurs in a wide variety of mammalian species, it is likely a conserved feature from their common ancestor.

The pocket is a common area for parasites to gather, and should be checked during a veterinary examination.
