= Calculus bovis =

Dried gallstones of cattle used in Chinese herbology

Calculus bovis, niu-huang (牛黃) or cattle gallstones are dried gallstones of cattle used in Chinese herbology. In China and Japan it has been long used to treat various diseases, including high fever, convulsion and stroke.

In Asian countries, calculus bovis are sometimes harvested when steers (Bos taurus domesticus) are slaughtered. Their gall bladders are taken out, the bile is filtered, and the stones are cleaned and dried. The bezoars may also be surgically removed by veterinarians when working cattle become ill. In Western countries, they are usually discarded. Its equivalent in Hindu culture is Gorochana.

Calculus bovis have a color varying from golden yellow to brownish yellow. The shape of a stone is variable and depends on how it was formed, becoming spherical, oval, triangular, tubular, or irregular.

Since natural calculus bovis are scarce, they can be very expensive. In 2025, the leader of a gallstone trading company in Brazil reported paying between $1,700 and $4,000 an ounce which works out to a single gallstone being worth more than the meat of an entire cow.

There are artificial calculus bovis or bovis calculus artifactus used as substitutes. In China, these are manufactured from cholic acid derived from bovine bile combined with dry bovine bile powder, porcine ursodeoxycholic acid, taurine, bilirubin, cholesterol, etc. Chinese regulations forbid the use of artificial calculus bovis in 42 drugs.

Calculus bovis can be cultivated (induced) in vivo by implanting a foreign object and microbials into bovine biles. It can also be cultivated (precipitated) in vitro from bovine bile by adding ursodeoxycholic acid, cholic acid, and calcium bilirubinate, producing calculus bovis sativus. Unlike artificial calculus bovis, either type of cultivated calculus bovis can fully replace calculus bovis under Chinese regulations.
