= Chandelor v Lopus =

1603 English common law case

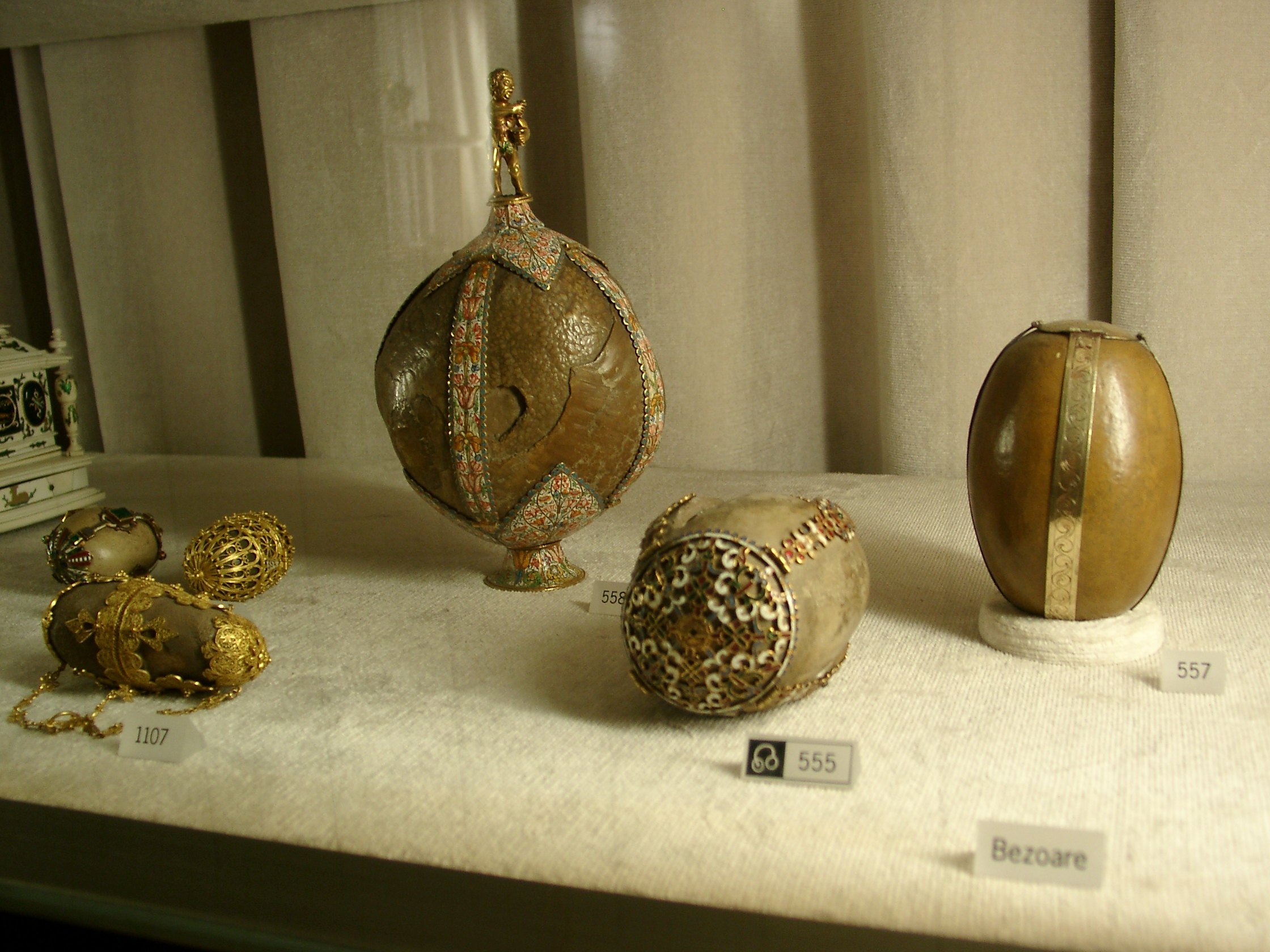
- Court: Court of Exchequer
- Citation: (1603) 79 Eng Rep 3; Cro Jac 4

Keywords
- Caveat emptor

Chandelor v Lopus (1603) 79 ER 3 is a case in the common law of England. It stands for the distinction between warranties and mere affirmations and announced the rule of caveat emptor (buyer beware).

== Facts ==
In 1603, a man paid £100 for what he thought was a bezoar stone. This is a stone that forms in animals' intestinal systems, and was believed to have magical healing properties. The seller (Chandelor) said it was a bezoar stone, which turned out to be false. The buyer (Lopus) sued for the return of the £100 purchase price.

How the claimant discovered that the bezoar did not work is not discussed in the report.

The issue for the court was whether the sales pitch had been the usual big talk of the market merchants in the plying of their wares, or if there had been indeed an actual deceit in the transaction.

== Judgment ==
The Exchequer Court held the buyer had no right to his money back, saying "the bare affirmation that it was a bezoar stone, without warranting it to be so, is no cause of action." The majority of the judges held that the buyer was required to show either that the seller knew the stone was not a bezoar, in which case the seller was liable for deceit, or that the seller had warranted (contractually guaranteed) that the stone was a bezoar, in which case the seller would be liable for breach of warranty. Since the seller in this case was not alleged to have done either of these things, the buyer's claim failed.

== Significance ==
Chandelor v Lopus long stood as an impediment to any common law development of consumer protection systems. Only in the nineteenth century did the law begin to evolve a doctrine of implied warranty. Chandelor v Lopus predated a common law recognition of fraudulent misrepresentation by 180 years.

== See also ==
- Cross v Gardner (1689) Cart. 90, Lord Holt CJ held that "An affirmation at the time of a sale is a warranty, provided it appears on evidence to be so intended."
- Heilbut, Symons & Co v Buckleton [1913] AC 30
- Oscar Chess Ltd v Williams [1957] 1 WLR 370
