= Gorochana =

Gallstones found in cattle

Gorochana (transliterated from Sanskrit: गोरोचन "cattle-light"; also Standard Tibetan: (gi-wang) gi-wang) are gallstones found in cattle (Sanskrit: गो go) such as bulls, cows, buffaloes, and yaks. Their presence in the animals is indicated by snoring and other sounds made by the animals in their sleep. The equivalent in Sinitic culture is calculus bovis. The vernacular Hindi and Bengali names are the same as the Sanskrit.

== Hindu dharma ==
In Hindu dharma, Indra once cast the five precious minerals, gold, silver, coral, pearl, and turquoise, into an ocean. These were eventually consumed by various animals, which then formed gallstones in their bodies. They have different colours and potencies based on the animals they are found in.

== Medicinal properties ==
Reputedly, Gorochana acts as an antidote to poisons, promote clear thoughts, and alleviate fevers and contagious diseases. The superior, mediocre, and inferior forms of these stones are reputed to respectively cure seven, five, or three poisoned patients. In medieval European medical traditions, gallstones were highly esteemed as an antidote to poisoning. 'Oriental gallstones' obtained from the East were particularly prized. In the Indian subcontinent, a drop of Gorochana will be given along with mother's milk, every particular day of the baby's birth. It is thought to increase babies' voice clarity.

== Sources and other properties ==
Gorochanas of the finest quality are obtained from the brain of an elephant and from the stomachs of cattle and other animals. Resembling the yellow yolk of a boiled egg, the yellow pigments obtained from a Gorochana are used as a tonic, sedative or tilaka to the forehead.
