= Caveat emptor =

Latin phrase and principle in contract law

Caveat emptor (/ˈɛmptɔːr/; from caveat, "may he/she beware", a subjunctive form of cavēre, "to beware" + ēmptor, "buyer") is Latin for "Let the buyer beware". It has become a proverb in English. Generally, caveat emptor is the contract law principle that controls the sale of real property after the date of closing, but may also apply to sales of other goods. The phrase caveat emptor and its use as a disclaimer of warranties arises from the fact that buyers typically have less information than the seller about the good or service they are purchasing. This quality of the situation is known as 'information asymmetry'. Defects in the good or service may be hidden from the buyer, and only known to the seller.

It is a short form of Caveat emptor, quia ignorare non debuit quod jus alienum emit ("Let a purchaser beware, for he ought not to be ignorant of the nature of the property which he is buying from another party.") I.e. the buyer should assure himself that the product is good and that the seller had the right to sell it, as opposed to receiving stolen property.

A common way that information asymmetry between seller and buyer has been addressed is through a legally binding warranty, such as a guarantee of satisfaction.

== Explanation ==
Under the principle of caveat emptor, the buyer could not recover damages from the seller for defects on the property that rendered the property unfit for ordinary purposes. The only exception was if the seller actively concealed latent defects or otherwise made material misrepresentations amounting to fraud.

Before statutory law, the buyer had no express warranty ensuring the quality of goods. In the UK, common law requires that goods must be "fit for the particular purpose" and of "merchantable quality", per Section 15 of the Sale of Goods Act but this implied warranty can be difficult to enforce and may not apply to all products. Hence, buyers are still advised to be cautious.

== By country ==
=== United States ===
==== Real estate ====
The modern trend in the U.S. is that the implied warranty of fitness for a particular purpose applies in the real-estate context to only the sale of new residential housing by a builder-seller and that the caveat emptor rule applies to all other real-estate sale situations (e.g. homeowner to buyer). Other jurisdictions have provisions similar to this.

==== Chattel property ====
Under Article 2 of the Uniform Commercial Code, the sale of new goods is governed by the "perfect-tender" rule unless the parties to the sale expressly agree in advance to terms equivalent to caveat emptor (such as describing the goods as sold "as is" and/or "with all faults") or other limitations such as the below-discussed limitations on remedies. The perfect-tender rule states that if a buyer who inspects new goods with reasonable promptness discovers them to be "nonconforming" (failing to meet the description provided or any other standards reasonably expectable by a buyer in his/her situation) and does not use the goods or take other actions constituting acceptance of them, the buyer may promptly return or refuse to accept ("reject") them and demand that the defect be remedied ("cured"). When goods fitting the same description and expectations are available for sale (e.g., when the vendor has other instances of the same mass-produced merchandise in stock inventory), either the vendor or the buyer may insist on an "even exchange" for other, "conforming" instances of the product. When conforming goods are not available in stock but are available for the dealer to purchase (usually on the open or "spot" market), the buyer may require that the seller obtain the goods elsewhere, even at a higher price, with the seller having to incur a loss equivalent to the price difference. If the vendor still does not or cannot provide the goods and the dispute proceeds to litigation (as opposed to renegotiation or settlement), then as in all cases of vendor breaches of contract, the buyer may recover only the damages that s/he would have suffered had s/he taken all feasible steps to minimize ("mitigate") his/her damages suffered.

As a default rule, the perfect-tender rule may be "contracted around" in ways that specify or limit a buyer's remedies (and that accordingly reduce the market price that rational buyers are willing to pay for the goods). In many cases, the vendor will not provide a refund but will provide store credit. In the cases of software, movies, and other copyrighted material, many vendors will offer only a direct exchange for another copy of the same title, with the effect that the initial transfer or license of intellectual-property rights is preserved. Most stores require proof of purchase and impose time limits on exchanges or refunds. Some larger chain stores, such as F.Y.E., Staples, Target, or Walmart, will, however, do exchanges or refunds at any time, with or without proof of purchase, although they usually require a form of picture identification and place per-transaction and/or per-person quantity or dollar limitations on such returns.

=== United Kingdom ===
In the UK, consumer law has moved away from the caveat emptor model, with laws passed that have enhanced consumer rights and allow greater leeway to return goods that do not meet legal standards of acceptance. Consumer purchases are regulated by the Consumer Rights Act 2015, whilst business-to-business purchases are regulated by the Sale of Goods Act 1979.

In the UK, consumers have the right to a full refund for faulty goods. However, traditionally, many retailers allow customers to return goods within a specified period (typically two weeks to two months) for a full refund or an exchange, even if there is no fault with the product. Exceptions may apply for goods sold as damaged or to clear.

Goods bought through "distance selling," for example online or by phone, also have a statutory "cooling off" period of fourteen calendar days during which the purchase contract can be cancelled and treated as if not done.

Although no longer applied in consumer law, the principle of caveat emptor is generally held to apply to transactions between businesses unless it can be shown that the seller had a clear information advantage over the buyer that could not have been removed by carrying out reasonable due diligence.

== Variations ==
=== Caveat venditor ===
Caveat venditor is Latin for "let the seller beware."

In the landmark case of MacPherson v. Buick Motor Co. (1916), New York Court Appeals Judge Benjamin N. Cardozo established that privity of duty is no longer required in regard to a lawsuit for product liability against the seller. This case is widely regarded as the origin of caveat venditor as it pertains to modern tort law in US.

=== Caveat lector ===
Caveat lector is a Latin phrase meaning "let the reader beware". It means that when reading something, the reader should take careful note of the contents, and undertake due diligence on whether the contents are accurate, relevant, reliable and so forth.

=== Caveat auditor ===
Another variant is Caveat Auditor, or "let the listener beware", where caution is urged regarding all messages, in particular spoken messages, such as a radio advertisement.

== See also ==
- As is
- Chandelor v Lopus
- List of Latin phrases
- The customer is always right
