= Hairball =

Mass of ingested hair created in the stomach, often regurgitated by cats

Example of the sounds and motions a common housecat makes when it is coughing up a hairball.

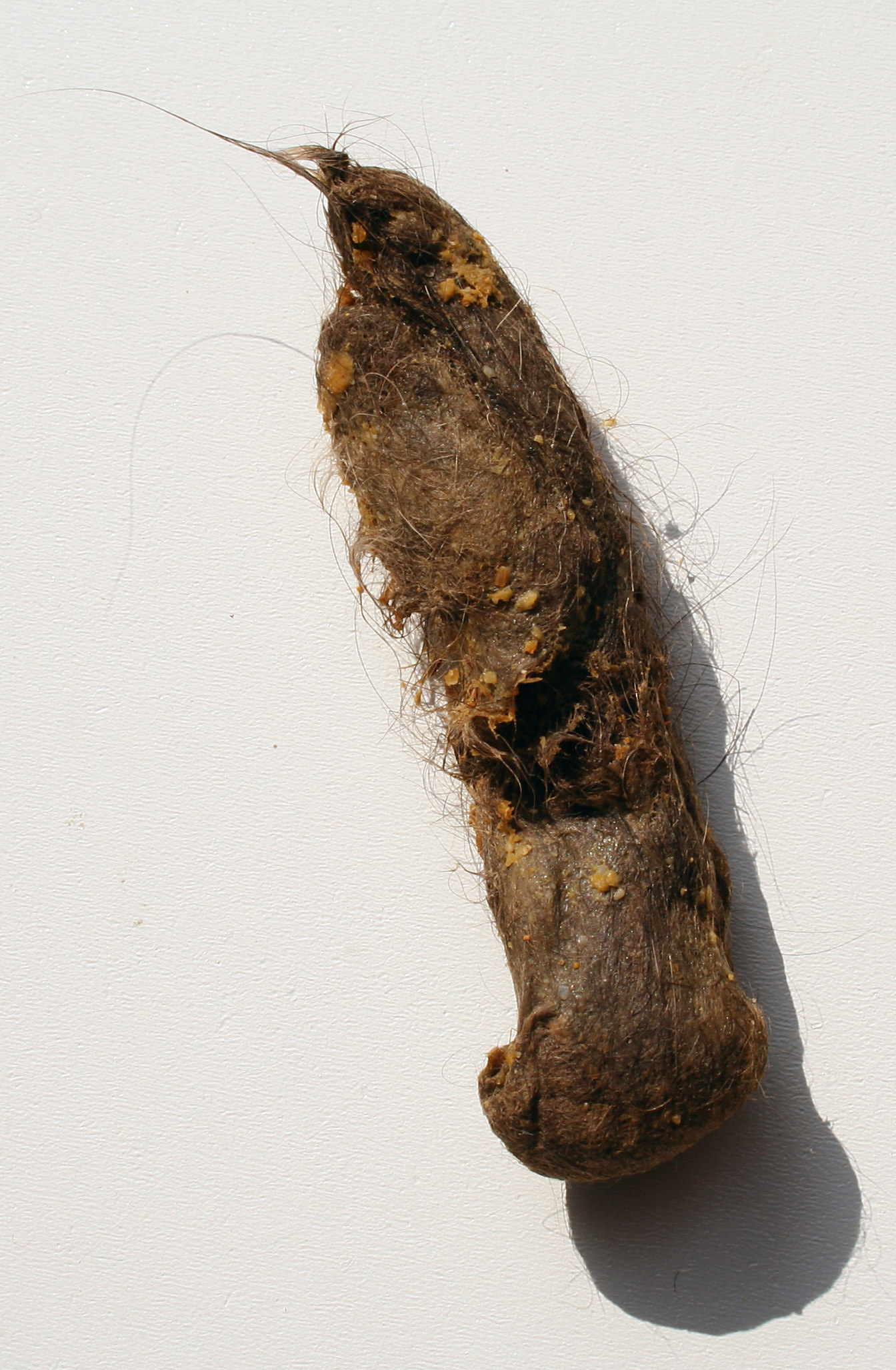
A 10 cm (3.9 in) cat hairball

A hairball is a small collection of hair or fur formed in the stomach of animals, and uncommonly in humans, that is occasionally vomited up when it becomes too big. Hairballs are primarily a tight elongated cylinder of packed fur, but may include bits of other elements such as swallowed food. Animals with hairballs are sometimes mistaken as having other conditions of the stomach such as lymphosarcoma, tuberculosis, and tumor of the spleen. Cats are especially prone to hairball formation since they groom themselves by licking their fur, and thereby ingest it. Rabbits are also prone to hairballs because they groom themselves in the same fashion as cats, but hairballs are especially dangerous for rabbits because they cannot regurgitate them. Due to the fragility of their digestive systems, hairballs in rabbits must be treated immediately or they may stop feeding and ultimately die from dehydration. Cattle are also known to accumulate hairballs but, as they do not vomit, these are found usually after death and can be quite large.

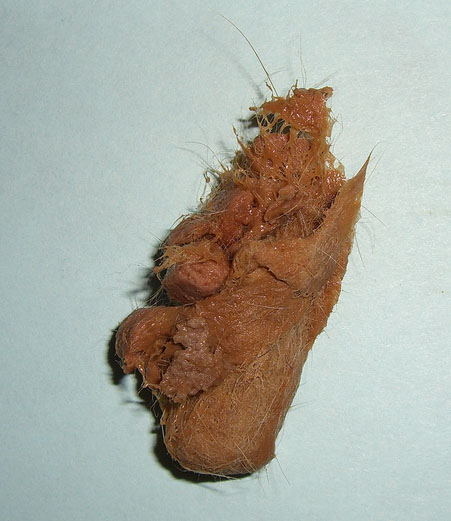
A 5 cm (2.0 in) cat hairball

== Clinical significance ==
A trichobezoar is a bezoar (a mass found trapped in the gastrointestinal system) formed from the ingestion of hair. Trichobezoars are often associated with trichotillomania (compulsive hair pulling). Trichobezoars are rare, but can be fatal if undetected. Surgical intervention is often required.

== Society and culture ==
Although uncommon in humans, some hairballs have been reported. These hairballs occur when hair strands collect in the stomach and are unable to be ejected due to not enough friction with the surface of the gastric mucosa. Hairballs are often seen in young girls as a result of trichophagia, trichotillomania, and pica. In 2003, a 3-year-old girl in Red Deer, Alberta, Canada, had a grapefruit-sized hairball surgically removed from her stomach; in 2006, an 18-year-old woman from Chicago, Illinois, had a 4.5 kg (9.9 lb) hairball surgically removed from her stomach; and in 2014, a 9-pound hairball was removed from the stomach of an 18-year-old in Kyrgyzstan. Hairballs can be quite hazardous in humans since hair cannot be digested or passed by the human gastrointestinal system, and (assuming it is identified) even vomiting may be ineffective at removing the hair mass. This can result in the general impairment of the digestive system.

== See also ==
- Pellet (ornithology)
- Rapunzel syndrome
