= Girdlestone =

Girdlestone is a surname. Notable people with the surname include:

- Cameron Girdlestone, Australian rower
- Charles Girdlestone (1797–1881), English clergyman and biblical commentator
- (Charlotte) Hester Girdlestone (born 1911), mother of Stephen Oliver (composer) (1950–1992) and grandmother of John Oliver (b. 1977)
- Cuthbert Girdlestone (1895–1975), British musicologist
- Dylan Girdlestone (born 1989), South African cyclist
- Edward Girdlestone (1805–1884), English cleric and labour activist
- Errol Girdlestone (born 1945), British music conductor
- Gathorne Robert Girdlestone (1881–1950), English orthopaedic surgeon, son of Robert Baker Girdlestone
- Henry Girdlestone (1863–1926), headmaster of St Peter's College, Adelaide, South Australia
- Keagan Girdlestone (born 1997) is a South African-New Zealand cyclist
- Robert Baker Girdlestone (1836–1923), English lexicographer, son of Charles Girdlestone
- Thomas Girdlestone (1758–1822), British physician and writer
