= James Atherton (tenor) =

American opera singer (1943–1987)

James Peyton Atherton Jr (April 27, 1943 – November 20, 1987) was an American tenor and artistic director. Classically trained, he went on to sing with numerous American opera companies. He also performed on stage in Europe.

== Early life and career ==
Atherton was born in Montgomery, Alabama, the son of James Peyton Atherton (1904–1972) and Anna Avery Thomas (1909–1993), both of Montgomery, Alabama.

He studied at the Peabody Conservatory, in Baltimore primarily with Martial Singher and Rosa Ponselle. He graduated with a Bachelor of Music in 1965.

He shorted his name for the stage to simply "James Atherton" and had a successful career as a tenor and music director. He is listed as a noteworthy tenor in Marquis Who's Who and is recognized in the Alabama Music Hall of Fame.

He first sang on stage in Santa Fe, New Mexico

Early stage performances as tenor included Beethoven's Missa Solemnis at the Baltimore Symphony Orchestra in 1966 and Madama Butterfly with the Saint Paul Chamber Orchestra in 1971. He was a tenor in the Santa Fe Opera from 1973 to 1978.

1979 to 1980 were spent in the United Kingdom. In the early 1980s, he performed in San Francisco, Dallas, Houston and Miami.

His last performance at the Metropolitan Opera alongside Tatiana Troyanos, Gwyneth Jones and Aage Haugland, as an Innkeeper in Der Rosenkavalier, took place on September 27, 1985. This was his 277th appearance at the MET.

In his final year, Atherton had prepared for a production of George Frideric Handel's Rinaldo at the John F. Kennedy Center for the Performing Arts, in association with the Handel Festival Orchestra, directed by Stephen Simon, which rebranded during 1987, as the Washington Chamber Symphony.

Atherton specialized in opera roles as the secondary tenor. He served on the faculties of Peabody Conservatory, Goucher College, Towson University, and Dickinson College. However he eventually broadened his activities to stage management, as a stage director, and talent scout. This new career path was curtailed by a short illness, resulting in his untimely death at the age of 44.

== Chronology of stage performances ==
- 1971 – Atherton made his debut with the San Francisco Opera.
- 1973 – He accepted a position at the Santa Fe Opera. He sang the role of Sir Philip Wingrave in the American stage premiere of Britten's Owen Wingrave; the Schoolmaster in Janáček's The Cunning Little Vixen; Fenton in Verdi's Falstaff; Jo in The Mother of Us All; Monsieur Triquet in Tchaikovsky's Eugene Onegin; Antonio in Stephen Oliver's The Duchess of Malfi; Leukippos in Richard Strauss' Daphne; and as Pluto in Jacques Offenbach's Orpheus in the Underworld.
- 1976 – He accepted a position at the Canadian Opera Company. He sang as Fritz in Offenbach's La Grande-Duchesse de Gérolstein.
- 1977 – He sang with the Metropolitan Opera, New York City, as the Goro in Madama Butterfly
- 1977 – He sang with the Metropolitan Opera as the Holy Fool and Simpleton in Boris Godunov, debuting on October 17, 1977; returning in 17 other roles.
- 1979–1980 – He made his debut at Glyndebourne in Haydn's La fedeltà premiata. 22 performances including one at the Royal Albert Hall conducted by Bernard Haitink.
- 1983 – Houston Symphony
- 1985 – Ariadne auf Naxos at the Metropolitan.
- 1980–1987 – His career evolved into stage direction. He was the artistic director of the opera studio at the St. Louis Conservatory at the time of his death in 1987.

== Recordings ==
- Cavalleria rusticana by Pietro Mascagni. Pagliacci / Leoncavallo; The Metropolitan Opera presents (1978)
- Il crociato in Egitto by Giacomo Meyerbeer, alongside Yvonne Kenny, Felicity Palmer, Rockwell Blake, Justino Díaz. Conducted by Gianfranco Masini
- The Mother of Us All [sound recording] / music by Virgil Thomson; text by Gertrude Stein (1977).

The Met also televised several of his performances, including The Magic Flute in 1979.

== Personal ==
Atherton died of an HIV related illness in his adoptive hometown of St. Louis, Missouri, on November 20, 1987.

He is buried at Greenwood Cemetery, Montgomery, Alabama. His obituary was printed in The New York Times on November 24, 1987.

== Ancestry ==
His paternal ancestors came to Alabama from McLean County, Kentucky. His great-great-grandfather, William Atherton died there in 1879.

== See also ==
- List of performers at the Metropolitan Opera, Atherton gave 277 performances between October 17, 1977, and September 27, 1985.
