= Richard Croft (tenor) =

American opera singer

Richard Croft (born February 1954) is an American lyric tenor who has had a career in operas and concerts for more than 40 years. He made his debut at the Santa Fe Opera in 1978 while in that company's apprentice artist program. He began his opera career in the United States in performances of the major roles of Mozart and Rossini, before being invited on the leading international stages. He won the Metropolitan Opera National Council Auditions in 1984, and later made his debut at the Metropolitan Opera ("Met") in 1991 as Belmonte in Mozart's Die Entführung aus dem Serail. He has continued to perform periodically at the Met, most recently as Solomon Kavalier in Mason Bates's The Amazing Adventures of Kavalier & Clay in 2025-2026. He maintains an international career in theaters while teaching on the voice faculty of the University of North Texas College of Music. He has performed at major opera houses like La Scala, the Lyric Opera of Chicago, the Paris Opera, the Berlin State Opera, the Houston Grand Opera, and the San Francisco Opera.

== Early life and education ==
Richard Croft was born in Cooperstown, New York in February 1954. He grew up in nearby Hartwick, New York and is the brother of baritone Dwayne Croft. A public school music teacher encouraged him to pursue his talent at singing, and he attended the State University of New York at Oneonta where he was a voice student of William Cole. After graduating he moved to New York City where he was initially employed as a construction worker. He apprenticed at the Santa Fe Opera in 1978; making his professional debut with that company in that year as the Jester in Stephen Oliver's The Duchess of Malfi.

== Career ==
In June 1980 Croft portrayed Don Ramiro in Gioachino Rossini's La Cenerentola at Northwestern University's Cahn Auditorium in a production mounted by Opera Midwest, and repeated that role later in the year with Texas Opera Theater (the touring arm of Houston Grand Opera) with Patricia Schuman as Cinderella. In 1981 he gave his first performance at the Opera Theatre of Saint Louis (OTSL) as Kawaguchiya in the United States premiere of Minoru Miki's An Actor's Revenge. In 1982 he made his debut at the Washington National Opera (WNO, then Washington Opera) as Bardolfo in Giuseppe Verdi's Falstaff, and in 1983 he performed Ernesto in Donizetti's Don Pasquale at first the Eugene Opera of Oregon and then the Midwest Opera Theatre.

In 1984 Croft was one of several winners of the Metropolitan Opera National Council Auditions. That same year he sang Donizetti's Ernesto with Opera Illinois. and returned to Eugene Opera as Rossini's Don Ramiro. In 1985 he portrayed Count Almaviva in Rossini's The Barber of Seville with the Opera Company of Philadelphia and the Piedmont Opera, and made his Canadian debut as a soloist in Handel's Messiah with the National Arts Centre Orchestra led by Brian Law. He later returned to Philadelphia to portray in Donizetti's Ernesto (1991) and Ferrando in Mozart's Così fan tutte (1996).

In 1986 Croft portrayed Belfiore in the first staging in the United States of Rossini’s Il viaggio a Reims at the OTSL; a company he returned to the following year as Don Ramiro. In February 1986 he sang Fenton in Falstaff at the Sarasota Opera. He also returned to the WNO many times; performing roles like Nemorino in Gaetano Donizetti's L'elisir d'amore (1986), Donizetti's Ernesto (1987), Rossini's Count Almaviva (1988), and Ferrando in Mozart's Così fan tutte (1991 & 1996).

Croft made his European debut in 1987 at the Opéra de Nice as Don Ottavio in Mozart's Don Giovanni; and later returned to that opera house in 1991 to reprise Don Ottavio and perform the role of Mozart's Ferrando. He performed several times at the Drottningholm Palace Theatre; portraying Belfiore in Mozart's La finta giardiniera (1988), Achilles in Gluck’s Iphigénie en Aulide (1989), and Belmonte in Die Entführung aus dem Serail (1989). He also sang Belmonte with the Welsh National Opera in 1989. He repeated the role of Count Almaviva at the Dutch National Opera in 1991, and that same year performed the part of Don Ottavio at the Glyndebourne Festival. He returned to the Dutch National Opera in 1993 as Agenore in Il re pastore and Sifare in Mozart's Mitridate, re di Ponto.

In 1991 Croft made his debut at the Metropolitan Opera ("Met") as Mozart's Belmonte. He subsequently returned to the Met in his signature roles of Don Ottavio and Rossini's Count Almaviva; notably portraying the latter role opposite his brother as Figaro in 1998. In 1992 he performed at the Cologne Opera as Mozart's Ferrando, and later was heard at that theater as Nerone in Monteverdi’s L'incoronazione di Poppea. In September 1992 he portrayed Iago in Rossini's Otello at the Lyric Opera of Chicago. He returned to the Santa Fe Opera as Belmonte (1994), Tom Rakewell in The Rake's Progress (1996), and Tito in La clemenza di Tito (2002). Other international performances include appearances as a guest artist at the Strasbourg Opera House, the Opera de Toulouse, and the Opéra de Montréal. In 1996 he returned to the Glyndebourne Festival as Septimius in Theodora.

Richard Croft has been Professor of Voice at the University of North Texas College of Music since 2004. While teaching he has maintained a performance career, including some performances in Texas. In 2001 he performed the role of Ferrando at the Houston Grand Opera (HGO) with Joyce DiDonato as Dorabella. He subsequently played Count Almaviva to DiDonato's Rosina in the HGO's 2003 production of The Barber of Seville. He returned to the HGO in 2005 in the title role in Mozart's Idomeneo. He gave another Texas performance of Count Almaviva in 2006, this time with the Dallas Opera and Vivica Genaux in the part of Rosina. He previously appeared with Dallas Opera as Don Ottavio in 2003.

In 2006 Croft created the role of the Blind Harpist in the world premiere of Elliot Goldenthal's Gredel at the Los Angeles Opera (LAO). In the summer of 2008 he portrayed Lurcanio in Handel's Ariodante at the San Francisco Opera with Ruth Ann Swenson in the title role. In 2008 and 2011 he returned to the Met to portray Mohandas Gandhi in Philip Glass's Satyagraha. In 2009 he performed for the grand reopening of the newly renovated theatre, Royal Opera of Versailles, and sang the title role in Idomeneo at La Scala. In 2010 and 2012 he returned to the Met as Loge in Richard Wagner's Das Rheingold directed by Robert Lepage, along with his brother Dwayne in the role of Donner. In 2012 he portrayed Idomeneo in a semi-stage version of Mozart's opera with the Chicago Symphony Orchestra at the Ravinia Festival. In 2014 he portrayed Captain Vere in Benjamin Britten's Billy Budd at the LAO.

In 2017 Croft portrayed the title role in La clemenza di Tito at the Glyndebourne Festival. In 2025-2026 he returned to the Met as Solomon Kavalier in Mason Bates's The Amazing Adventures of Kavalier & Clay. He has also performed at the Salzburg Festival, Paris Opera, Staatsoper Berlin, Zurich Opera, Theater an der Wien.
