= FHO =

FHO may refer to:

- Femoral head ostectomy
- Foreign Armies East (German: Abteilung Fremde Heere Ost), a Nazi German military intelligence organization
- Foundation house officer
- University of Applied Sciences of Eastern Switzerland (German: Fachhochschule Ostschweiz)
