= David Horne =

David Horne may refer to:

- David Horne (composer) (born 1970), Scottish composer, pianist, and teacher
- David Horne (actor) (1898–1970), British actor
