= Sneaky Pete (disambiguation) =

Sneaky Pete is an American crime drama series created by David Shore and Bryan Cranston.

Sneaky Pete may also refer to:

- Sneaky Pete (cue), a two-piece cue constructed to resemble a house cue, with a near-invisible wood-to-wood joint
- Sneaky Pete Kleinow (1934–2007), American musician
- Sneaky Pete's, a chain of hot-dog restaurants
- Sneaky Pete, a slang expression for bootleg liquor
- "Sneaky Pete", a song by Jesse Stone and his Orchestra
- Lew Robinson, drag racer nicknamed "Sneaky Pete"
