= The Duchess of Malfi (opera) =

The Duchess of Malfi is an opera in three acts by the British composer Stephen Oliver, based on the eponymous play by John Webster. Oliver originally wrote this opera, his ninth, in 1971, at age 21, for a production at the Oxford Playhouse on commission from the Oxford University Opera Club. The premiere was on November 23, 1971, with the following cast members:

- Jillian Crowe (The Duchess)
- Keith Jones (Antonio)
- Marion Milford (Julia)
- Peter Reynolds (The Cardinal)
- Stephen Oliver (Bosola)
- Anthony Sargent (Ferdinand)
- Alison Stamp (Cariola)

The conductor was Peter Robinson, and the director Julian Hope.

Oliver then rewrote the work, and the revised version received its US premiere at Santa Fe Opera on August 5, 1978.

== Roles, voice types and interpreters ==
Role	Voice type	Interpreter
The Duchess of Malfi	Soprano	Pamela Myers
The Cardinal	Bass-baritone	William Dooley
Daniel de Bosola	Baritone	Ronald Hedlund
Ferdinand, Duke of Calabria	Tenor	David Hillman
Antonio Bologna	Tenor	James Atherton
Delio	Tenor	Jonathan Mack
Castruccio	Bass-baritone	Hal Thomas
Silvio	Tenor	Vincenzo Manno
Jester	Tenor	Richard Croft
Cariola	Soprano	Vonna Miller
First Officer	Tenor	James Anderson
Second Officer	Baritone	Neal Schwantes
A mad priest	Tenor	James Justiss
A mad astrologer	Tenor	Vincenzo Manno
A mad lawyer	Baritone	John Brandstetter
A mad doctor	Bass-baritone	Tony Dillon
A doctor	Bass	Thomas Hammons

== Synopsis ==
The play is set in the court of Malfi (Amalfi), Italy. The young Duchess has recently been widowed, but her brothers, Ferdinand and the Cardinal, do not wish her to share their inheritance with a new spouse. They thus forbid her from remarrying. The brothers place Daniel de Bosola in her household as a spy. Nonetheless, the Countess falls in love with Antonio, her steward, and they secretly marry. Eventually, the brothers discover the marriage and imprison their sister. In the climatic duel, Bosola and Ferdinand wind up killing each other.
