= Vicesimus Knox =

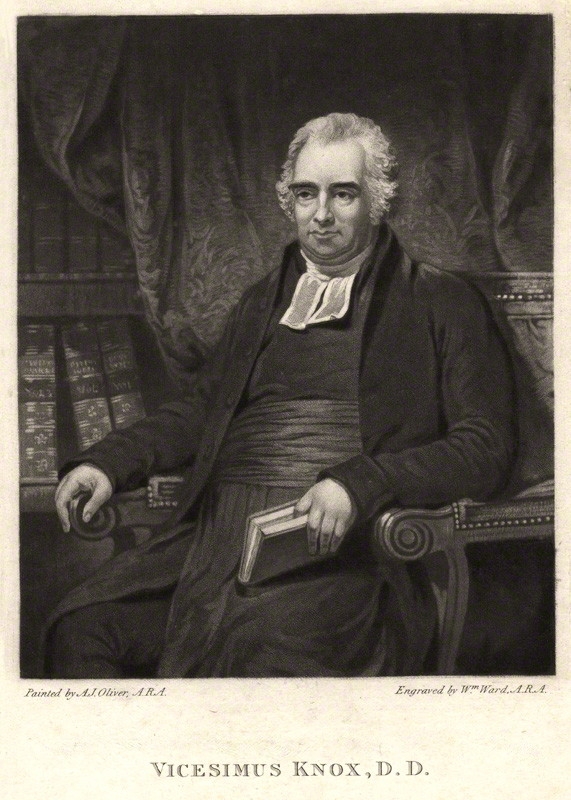
Vicesimus Knox, 1809 engraving

Vicesimus Knox (1752–1821) was an English essayist, headmaster and Anglican priest.

== Life ==
Knox was born 8 December 1752, at Newington Green, Middlesex, the son of Vicesimus Knox (1729–1780), a cleric and schoolmaster, and his wife Ann Wall, daughter of Devereux Wall. He was educated at St John's College, Oxford, matriculating in 1771 graduating in 1775. Meanwhile, his father became headmaster of Tonbridge School in 1772. Knox became a Fellow of his college, and was ordained by Robert Lowth, becoming deacon in 1775 and priest in 1776.

Knox replaced his father, who was in poor health, as headmaster of Tonbridge School in 1778. He was successful in raising the number of pupils, from around 20 to around 80. Among Knox's students were Charles Girdlestone and John Mitford.

During the 1790s Knox was critical of British foreign policy, towards France and Poland, in articles written for the Morning Chronicle. The pupil numbers at the school fell back again, after his unpopular views became known.

Knox accumulated some livings: Shipborne (1800, a chapelry, as bequest from William Holles Vane, 2nd Viscount Vane), Ramsden Crays (1801), and Runwell (1807). But he did not become vicar of Tonbridge when the incumbent Henry Harpur died in 1790, the advowson passing out of the Vane family (to David Papillon), and John Rawstorn Papillon being appointed. Theophilus Lindsey had an account from Henry Austen of West Wickham of Knox acting as stand-in after Harpur's death, as a showy preacher who made pointed remarks about Unitarians that Austen took personally.

== Views ==
As an essayist Knox wrote extensively on morals and literature, and as a minister he preached often on behalf of philanthropic causes and against war.

=== War and peace ===
Knox argued that

"If the Christian religion in all its purity, and in its full force, were suffered to prevail universally, the sword of offensive war must be sheathed for ever, and the din of arms would at last be silenced in perpetual peace".

and that

"The total abolition of war, and the establishment of perpetual and universal peace, appear to me to be of more consequence than any thing ever achieved, or even attempted, by mere mortal man, since the creation".

=== Novels ===
Knox's Essays Moral and Literary, Volume II, contains Essay XVIII "On Novel Reading", which begins "If it is true, that the present age is more corrupt than the preceding, the great multiplication of Novels probably contributes to its degeneracy." He considered that contact with Gil Blas or Devil Upon Two Sticks, picaresque novels by Alain-René Lesage, could cause a schoolboy to lose the taste for Latin classics.

The sentimental novel was explicitly linked by Knox to solitary vice. An early critic of Laurence Sterne, he took issue with the morality of A Sentimental Journey Through France and Italy. He complained that Sterne and Elizabeth Draper, of Journal to Eliza, had too many imitators. Winter Evenings has a story of Belinda who was too fond of "pathetic" novels. Knox approved of travel writing.

== Works ==
Knox wrote:

- Essays Moral and Literary, anon. London; 2nd edition, corrected and enlarged, London 1779; Volume the Second, with 39 additional essays, was published in 1779, London, after the second edition of the original volume had appeared with Knox's name on the title-page; 12th edition, New York, 1793, 2 vols.; another edition, Basil, 1800; 17th edition, Lond. 1815, 3 vols.; in James Ferguson's British Essayists, 2nd edition, vols. xxxv–vii. London 1823; new edition, London 1823, 3 vols., a duplicate of the preceding, without the collective title-pages; another edition in Robert Lynam's British Essayist, vol. xxii. and xxiii., London 1827. Other editions are given in William Thomas Lowndes's Bibliographer's Manua (Bohn).
- Liberal Education, or a Practical Treatise on the Methods of acquiring Useful and Polite Learning, Lond. 1781; 10th edition, Lond. 1789, 2 vols., with a letter to Lord North. Answered in An Examination of the Important Question whether Education at a Great School or by Private Tuition is preferable (1782) by Percival Stockdale.
- Elegant Extracts, or Useful and Entertaining Passages in Prose, selected for the improvement of Scholars at Classical and other Schools in the Art of Speaking, in Reading, Thinking, Composing, and in the Conduct of Life, anon. Lond. 1783; 10th edition, anon. Lond. 1816, 2 vols. ‘The Prose Epitome, or Elegant Extracts abridged,’ anon. Lond. 1791.
- Winter Evenings, or Lucubrations on Life and Letters, anon. Lond. 1788, 3 vols.; 2nd edition, Lond. 1790, 8vo, 2 vols.; 3rd edition, Lond. 1795, 3 vols.; new edition, Basil [printed], Paris, 1800, 2 vols.; new edition, Lond. 1823, 3 vols.; another edition is contained in Robert Lynam's British Essayists, vols. xxix. and xxx., Lond. 1827.
- Elegant Extracts, or Useful and Entertaining Pieces of Poetry, selected for the improvement of Youth, anon. London 1789; other editions, anon. Lond. 1801, 1805, and 1816; The Poetical Epitome, or Elegant Extracts abridged, anon. London 1807
- Elegant Epistles, or a copious Collection of Familiar and Amusing Letters, selected for the improvement of young Persons, and for general Entertainment, Lond. 1790; another edition, Dublin, 1791. The ‘Elegant Extracts,’ both in prose and verse, and the ‘Elegant Epistles’ were frequently reprinted together; an edition was published by Sharpe in 1810 (18 vols.); ‘a new edition … prepared by J. G. Percival,’ 1842, Boston, Mass., (6 vols.); sometimes the ‘Family Lectures’ were added.
- Family Lectures, or Domestic Divinity; being a copious Collection of Sermons, selected from … Divines of the present century, for the Use of Schools, anonymously edited by Knox, London 1791–5, 2 vols.; the second, or "new volume", has an altered title; reprinted in 1815, and subsequently published in 1 vol. to match the Elegant Extracts. The preachers included Thomas Newlin.
- Sermons, chiefly intended to promote Faith, Hope, and Charity, London 1792; 2nd edition, corrected, London 1793. The first edition contained some adverse remarks about Unitarians in the preface, and John Disney published a pamphlet Letters to Vicesimus Knox, D. D. occasioned by his Reflections on Unitarian Christians. Henry Barry Peacock then defended Knox.
- Personal Nobility, or Letters to a young Nobleman on the Conduct of his Studies and the Dignity of the Peerage, anon. Lond. 1793; dedicated to Charles James Fox.
- Antipolemus, or the Plea of Reason, Religion, and Humanity against War; a Fragment, translated from Erasmus and addressed to Aggressors, anon. Lond. 1794. The extracts were from the Dulce bellum inexpertis, Adagia and Querela Pacis of Desiderius Erasmus. Knox wrote a lengthy introduction against the War of the First Coalition, which had set Great Britain against France.
- The Spirit of Despotism … London, printed in the year 1795; Philadelphia, reprinted … Nov. 28, mdccxcv; it blames exploitation in Britain on returning nabobs. There were four later editions, "dedicated to Lord Castlereagh",’ and "edited by the author of the "Political House that Jack Built"" (i.e. William Hone), published in 1821, Lond.; another edition by the same editor appeared in 1822, Lond. with Knox's name on the title-page; the 10th edition appeared in the fifth volume of Knox's Works; 11th edition, with A Preliminary Dissertation on Government, Law, and Reform, and the Life and Character of Dr. Knox, the Author, London 1837, with portrait. Hone states that the book was first privately printed in London, in 1795, but was suppressed by Knox; but the American edition may have been the first.
- Christian Philosophy, or an Attempt to Display the Evidence and Excellence of Revealed Religion, Lond. 1795, 2 vols.; 3rd edition, with an appendix on Mr. Paine's "Pamphlet on Prayer, on Psalmody, and a short List of Books for the use of the … unlearned reader", London 1798. First American edition, Philadelphia, 1804; another edition, with an introductory essay by the Rev. Henry Stebbing, appeared in vol. xix. of Cattermole and Stebbing's Sacred Classics, London 1835; and later editions, London 1854, &c.
- Considerations on the Nature and Efficacy of the Lord's Supper, Lond. 1799; 2nd edition, abridged, Lond. 1800.
- Remarks on the tendency of certain Clauses in a Bill now pending in Parliament to degrade Grammar Schools. With cursory Strictures on the national importance of preserving inviolate the Classical discipline prescribed by their Founders, London 1821; second edition corrected, in The Pamphleteer for 1822.
- The Works of Vicesimus Knox, D.D.: With a Biographical Preface (1824)

Also single sermons and anonymously issued editions of Juvenal and Persius (1784) and of Catullus (1784; reprinted 1824). Thomas De Quincey called Knox "a writer now entirely forgotten" in a footnote to his Philosophy of Herodotus (1842).

== Family ==
Knox in 1778 married Mary Miller (died 1809). Their children were:

- Holles Josiah, died young
- Vicesimus (d. 1855), a barrister, married in 1845 Lucy, third daughter of Ralph Bernal; after his death she married Seymour Tremenheere
- Thomas (1784–1843), who succeeded his father as headmaster of Tonbridge School in 1812
- Sarah.
