= Pearson Commission =

The Royal Commission on Civil Liability and Compensation for Personal Injury, better known as the Pearson commission was a United Kingdom royal commission, established in 1973 under the chairmanship of Lord Pearson. The commission reported in 1978 and made radical recommendations for tort reform, Pearson believing that tort's traditional role of compensation had become outdated with the rise of the welfare state since the end of World War II. He saw the benefits system as having the primary role of providing compensation and security following an accident, and litigation as being secondary. As a result, the commission recommended a no-fault insurance scheme for road traffic and industrial accidents, similar to the subsequent New Zealand Accident Compensation Corporation, and a scheme of strict liability for consumer protection. However, the government's response was cool and the recommendations were not followed up, much to Pearson's disappointment.

== Terms of reference ==
The commission's terms of reference were:

To consider to what extent, in what circumstances and by what means compensation should be payable in respect of death or personal injury (including ante-natal injury) suffered by any person in the course of employment; through the use of a motor vehicle or other form of transport; through the manufacture, supply or use of goods or services; on premises belonging to or occupied by another or otherwise through the act or omission of another where compensation under the present law is recoverable only on proof of fault or under the rules of strict liability, having regard to the cost and other implications of the arrangements for the recovery of compensation, whether by way of compulsory insurance or otherwise.

== Members ==
The commission's members were:

- Lord Pearson (chairman)
- Lord Allen of Abbeydale
- Lord Cameron
- Walter Anderson, former general secretary, National and Local Government Officers Association
- Norman Marsh QC, Law Commission
- Prof. Richard Schilling, former professor of occupational health, London School of Hygiene and Tropical Medicine
- Ronald Skerman, chief actuary, Prudential Assurance Company
- Margaret Brooke, former vice-chairman (sic) National Federation of Women's Institutes
- Prof. Robert Duthie, Nuffield Professor of orthopaedic surgery, Oxford University
- Robert MacCrindle QC
- Denis Marshall, solicitor, member of the council of the Law Society of England and Wales
- Prof. Alan Prest, professor of economics, London School of Economics
- A. Sansom, managing director, Iron Trades Employers Federation
- Prof. Olive Stevenson, head of department of social policy and social work, Keele University
- James Stewart WS
- Alan Ure, director, Trollope & Colls

== Recommendations ==
Recovery of damages in tort - no profound changes were recommended but deduction from damages for social security benefits received was recommended and this was subsequently implemented. There was a further recommendation for the introduction of structured settlements but this was not implemented until 1 April 2005 and without the inflation-proofing that the commission had recommended.

Work injuries - a no-fault insurance scheme administered by the Department of Health and Social Security (DHSS), financed by employers and providing benefits at the level of the State Earnings-Related Pension Scheme. The scheme was also proposed to extend to the self-employed and injuries incurred during commuting.

Road injuries - a no-fault insurance scheme administered by the DHSS, financed by a levy on petrol, estimated at 1p per gallon (0.8p per litre at 2003 prices)

Air transport, Sea and inland waterways - the commission noted that this was largely constrained by international conventions such as the Warsaw Convention but regretted the low level of settlements allowed.

Rail transport - a no-fault scheme was rejected in favour of proposed strict liability for accidents arising from movement of rolling stock.

Products liability - a no-fault scheme was rejected and the strict liability scheme drafted by the Council of Europe and the Commission of the European Union favoured. These European initiatives ultimately led to European Community Directive 85/374/EEC and the Consumer Protection Act 1987.

Services in general - retention of existing remedies for the tort of negligence.

Medical injuries - a no-fault scheme was not recommended but the commission held that the New Zealand and Sweden experience should be studied and reviewed. Strict liability for injury to human volunteers in clinical trials was recommended. No such strict liability was introduced and subsequent volunteers often faced complex litigation as following the disastrous TGN1412 trial in 2006.

Children - The commission proposed a general benefit for severely disabled children, no matter how their disability was caused, to be financed from general taxation.

Vaccine damage - The commission proposed that this would be compensated by the general benefit for severely disabled children. Where vaccination took place on the recommendation of the government, strict liability was proposed.

Ante-natal injury - The commission proposed that this would be compensated by the general benefit for severely disabled children and by strict liability such as it applied to pharmaceuticals. The provisions of the Congenital Disabilities (Civil Liability) Act 1976 should be restricted as it affected family members.

Occupiers' liability - no change to law on occupiers' liability save the introduction of the Law Commissions recommendations on liability to trespassers which ultimately led to the Occupiers' Liability Act 1984.

Criminal injuries - activities of Criminal Injuries Compensation Authority endorsed and to be reviewed in the light of proposals for civil liability.

Animals - no change save for aligning Scottish law with that of England and Wales and Northern Ireland.

Exceptional risks - strict liability on "controllers of things or operations that by their unusually hazardous nature require supervision because of their potential for causing death or personal injury."

== Reception ==
The Labour government expressed some caution over the recommendations, especially those as to no-fault compensation. The Conservative Party and insurance industry were hostile. The Conservative Party came to power in the 1979 United Kingdom general election and by 1983, the no-fault proposals, though not explicitly rejected, were falling into neglect.

== Bibliography ==
- [Various authors] (1978) Royal Commission on Civil Liability and Compensation for Personal Injury, Stationery Office, Cmnd. 7054
- Allen, D. K. et al. (eds) (1979). Accident Compensation after Pearson. London: Sweet & Maxwell. ISBN 0-421-25810-1.
- Berlins, M. (17 March 1978). "Pearson Report: Plan for 'no fault' compensation for road accident victims financed by petrol tax". The Times. p. 4, col.D.
