= Thomas Newlin =

English cleric

Thomas Newlin (1688–1743) was an English cleric, known as a preacher.

== Life ==
The son of William Newlin, rector of St. Swithin's, Winchester, he was baptised there 29 October 1688. From 1702 to 1706 he was a scholar of Winchester College, and was elected demy of Magdalen College, Oxford, in 1706. He graduated B.A. 26 June 1710, M.A. 7 May 1713, and B.D. 8 July 1727. He was a fellow of Magdalen from 1717 to 1721.

Newlin frequently preached in Latin and English before the university. While his general reputation was apparently good, he had a critic in Thomas Hearne, who said "if he would not print he might pass for a tolerable preacher". On 27 September 1720 he was presented to the college living of Upper Beeding, Sussex.

Newlin died 24 February 1743, and was buried at Beeding on 11 March (according to the register; perhaps 2nd is meant). An epitaph records his defence of the constitution and liturgy of the church of England, and other virtues.

== Works ==
Newlin's works were, besides individual sermons:

- The Sinner Enslaved by False Pretences, Oxford, 1718.
- Eighteen Sermons on Several Occasions, Oxford, 1720.
- One and Twenty Sermons on Several Occasions, Oxford, 1726.
- Bishop Parker's "History of his own Time", in Four Books, faithfully translated from the Latin original, London, 1727.

Sixteen of Newlin's sermons were reprinted in Family Lectures, London, 1791, edited by Vicesimus Knox. A high church man, he was yet interested in overcoming religious divisions.

== Family ==
Newlin married Susanna, daughter of Martin and Sarah Powell of Oxford (died 18 September 1732). They had no children. They repaired the ancient priory of Sele, held with the living of Beeding, in 1724 at their own expense.

== Notes ==
Attribution

This article incorporates text from a publication now in the public domain: Lee, Sidney, ed. (1894). "Newlin, Thomas". Dictionary of National Biography. Vol. 40. London: Smith, Elder & Co.
