= J. S. A. Spreull =

Scottish veterinarian

James Spreull Andrew Spreull FRSE FRCVS (1908–1998) was a 20th-century Scottish veterinarian, professor, and scientific author. He was a pioneer of tissue and skin transplant in animals.

== Life ==
He was born in Dundee on 2 May 1908, the son of Lt Col Andrew Spreull FRCVS and his wife Effie Andrew Spreull (his father's cousin). His father was an eminent veterinarian in the British Army. The family lived at 53 Magdalen Green in Dundee. His father ran two veterinary surgeries in Dundee with his oldest son Andrew, under the name of Andrew Spreull & Son. He was educated at the High School of Dundee then the Royal (Dick) School of Veterinary Studies School in Edinburgh.

He most of his life connected to the Dick Vet, beginning as a Demonstrator in 1930 and starting lecturing in 1931. In 1934 he gained his doctorate (PhD) and set up as a general vet in Dundee. Unusually he set up the last city centre blacksmiths, shoeing horses, and employing several smiths. In 1959 he was created Professor of Veterinary Surgery at the Dick Vet.

In 1961 he was the first to demonstrate and describe a Femoral head ostectomy (FHO).

He retired in 1978 and died in Broughty Ferry near Dundee on 16 May 1998 aged 90.

== Family ==
In 1951 he was married to Kirsten Brummerstedt-Hansen, and they had three sons.

== Publications ==
- Skin Transplantations for the Horse (1976)
- Routine Lens Extraction for the Treatment of Cataract in the Dog (1980)
- Treatment of Otitis media in the Dog (2008)
- Otitis Externa in the Dog (2008)
