= Andrew J. Carr =

Orthopaedic surgeon and professor

- Born: 1958 (age 67–68); Bradford, England
- Medical career
- Profession: Surgeon
- Institutions: Nuffield Orthopaedic Centre, University of Oxford
- Sub-specialties: Orthopaedic surgery
- Research: Patient-reported outcome, Shoulder surgery
- Awards: Robert Jones Gold medal of the British Orthopaedic Association; Hunterian Professorship of the Royal College of Surgeons of England; fellow of the Academy of Medical Sciences.

Andrew Jonathan Carr, FMedSci (born 1958 in Bradford, England) is a British surgeon and has been the sixth Nuffield Professor of Orthopaedics since 2001. He was head of the Nuffield Department of Orthopaedics, Rheumatology and Musculoskeletal Sciences at the University of Oxford between 2001 and March 2022 when he was succeeded to that role by Professor Jonathan Rees.

Carr's research interests are primarily focused on developing and evaluating surgical technologies including joint replacement, arthroscopy and tissue engineering. He has led a number of UK-wide surgical randomized Clinical trials. With colleagues in Oxford he pioneered the involvement of patients in assessing the outcome of orthopaedic operations and has invented a series of patient reported outcome measures (PROMS). The Oxford Scores are now used worldwide in clinical trials and by national joint replacement registries. He works on the effectiveness of surgery in the treatment of chronic musculoskeletal pain including the placebo role of surgical procedures and the importance of central sensitization in persistent post-operative pain.

In 2002 he founded the Botnar Research Centre as an Institute of Musculoskeletal Sciences. In 2008 he led the amalgamation of orthopaedics, rheumatology and musculoskeletal sciences to form a new department at Oxford University. In 2011, the department incorporated the Kennedy Institute of Rheumatology when it moved from Imperial College, London to the University of Oxford.

Carr was appointed founder Director of the National Institute for Health and Care Research (NIHR) Musculoskeletal Biomedical Research Unit (BRU) in Oxford in 2008 and, in 2011, became Divisional Director of the Nuffield Orthopaedic Centre section of the newly formed Oxford University Hospitals NHS Trust. His awards include the Robert Jones Gold medal of the British Orthopaedic Association and a Hunterian Professorship of the Royal College of Surgeons of England. He was elected a fellow of the Academy of Medical Sciences in 2009.

He has an honorary Doctorate in Medicine from the University of Copenhagen and an NIHR senior investigator award. In 2025 he was appointed a Member of the Order of the British Empire for services to orthopaedic research and training.
