= Robert Duthie =

British orthopaedic surgeon (1925–2005)

Robert Duthie CBE, FRCSE, FRCS
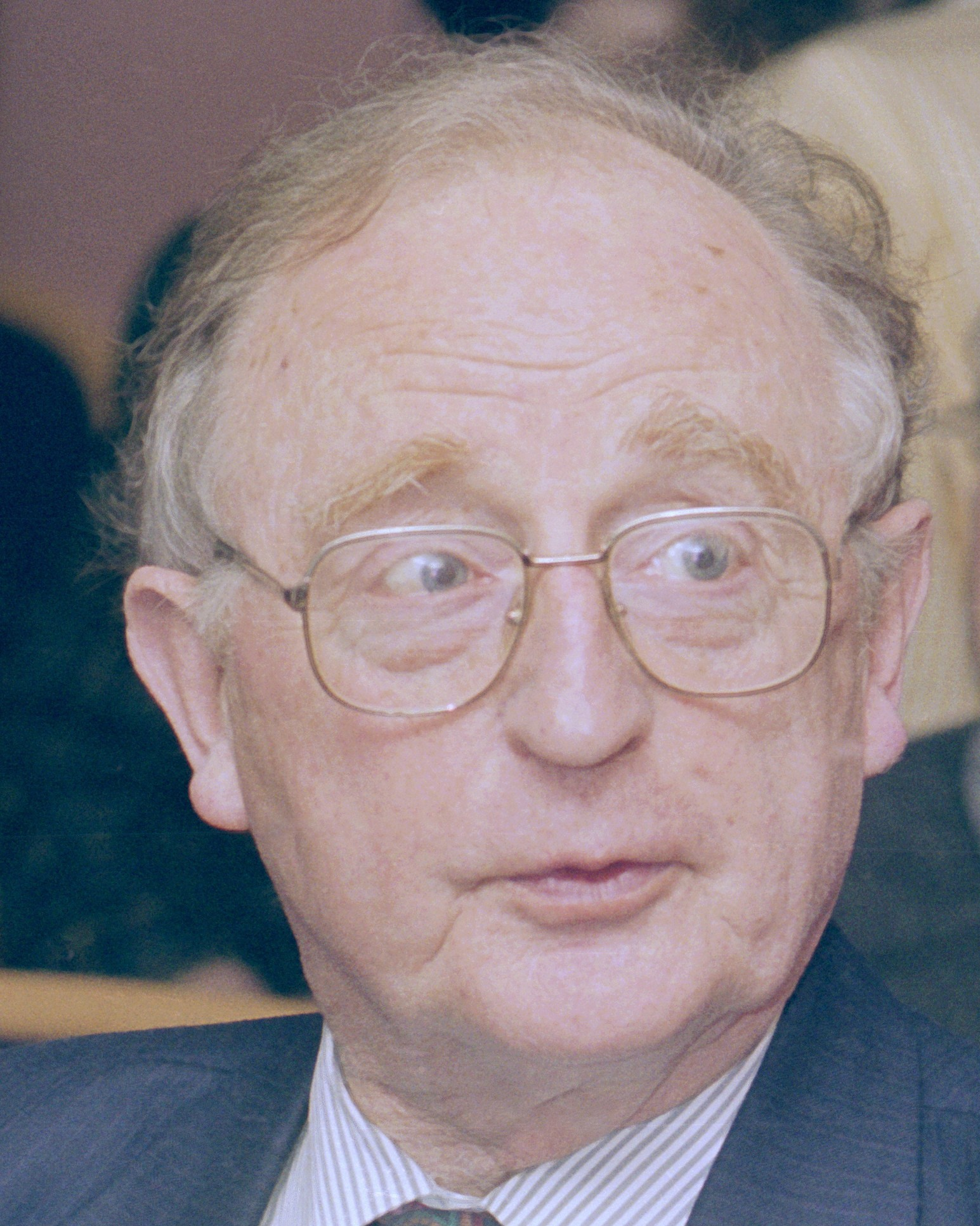
- Duthie in February 1998
- Born: 4 May 1925; United States
- Died: 25 December 2005 (aged 80)

Robert Buchan Duthie, CBE, FRCSE, FRCS (4 May 1925 – 25 December 2005) was an American-born British orthopaedic surgeon who established the prestige of the Nuffield Orthopaedic Centre in Oxford and built its leading reputation for musculoskeletal medicine. Duthie was the fourth Nuffield Professor of Orthopaedic Surgery at the University of Oxford, serving between 1966 and 1992.

Duthie developed novel methods of injury management and contributed to teaching and research, turning Oxford into a major centre for training. From 1973 to 1978 he served on the Pearson commission.

== Bibliography ==
- Biography in Plarr's Lives of the Fellows Online
- [Anon.] (2008) "Duthie, Prof. Robert Buchan", Who Was Who 1897-2007, A&C Black
- Bentley, G. & Dickson, R. (2006). "Obituary: Robert Buchan Duthie (1925-2005)". Journal of Bone and Joint Surgery. 88-B: 696–697. doi:10.1302/0301-620x.88b5.17844.
