= Nuffield Orthopaedic Centre =

Hospital in Oxford, UK

- Oxford University Hospitals NHS Foundation Trust
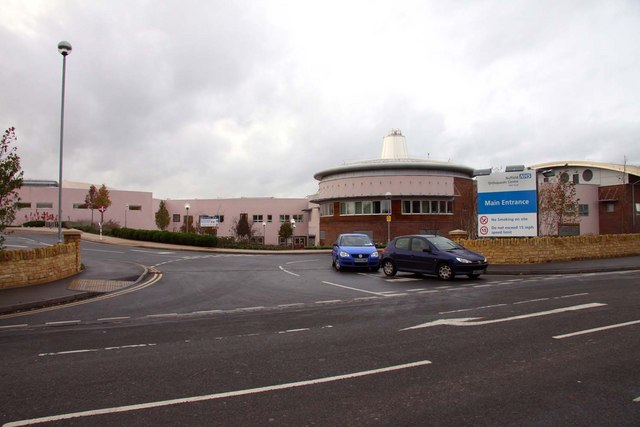
- Nuffield Orthopaedic Centre

- Shown in Oxfordshire

Geography
- Location: Oxford, Oxfordshire, England, United Kingdom
- Coordinates: 51°45′17″N 1°12′34″W

Organisation
- Care system: Public NHS
- Type: Specialist

Services
- Emergency department: No Accident & Emergency
- Speciality: Orthopaedic Surgery, Plastic Surgery, Rheumatology

History
- Founded: 1872

Links
- Website: http://www.ouh.nhs.uk/
- Lists: Hospitals in England

The Nuffield Orthopaedic Centre (NOC) is an orthopaedic hospital, with strong affiliations to the University of Oxford. It provides routine and specialist orthopaedic surgery, plastic surgery and rheumatology services to the people of Oxfordshire. Specialist services, such as the treatment of osteomyelitis and bone tumours, and the rehabilitation of those with limb amputation, congenital deficiency and neurological disabilities, are provided for patients from across the UK and abroad. It is managed by the Oxford University Hospitals NHS Foundation Trust.

== History ==
Funded by a donation from Mrs. Hannah Wingfield, the hospital began work as the Wingfield Convalescent Centre in 1872. During the First World War, it was a military hospital and was expanded by building a fresh air annexe of wooden buildings.

By 1929, the Wingfield Morris Hospital badly needed rebuilding and Lord Nuffield, then Sir William Morris, donated £70,000 to build new nurses' quarters, seven new wards and a massage department. In recognition of Morris' contribution, the hospital became the Wingfield-Morris Orthopaedic Hospital in 1930. In 1936, Lord Nuffield announced a further gift to Oxford University Medical School which created five clinical chairs, and Professor Gathorne Robert Girdlestone became the first Professor of Orthopaedic Surgery in 1937.

During the Second World War the hospital was controlled by the War Office. In 1948, it was designated as a regional orthopaedic centre and in 1950 it was renamed the Nuffield Orthopaedic Centre. Thanks among others to the appointments in 1949, of Josep Trueta and in 1966, of Robert Duthie, the centre established its prestige and international reputation. Duthie championed its independence and on 1 April 1991 the Nuffield Orthopaedic Centre became an NHS Trust hospital.

== Research ==
The Oxford University Hospitals NHS Foundation Trust is a member of the Oxford Research and Development Consortium. The research activities within the consortium are divided into fifteen collaborative research groups (CRGs). The NOC belongs to the musculo-skeletal group, which covers research activities in the fields of orthopaedics, rheumatology, metabolic medicine, neurological and functional rehabilitation and physiotherapy and have close links and collaboration with the University of Oxford and Oxford Brookes University.

== Nuffield Professors of Orthopaedic Surgery ==
The following is a list of Nuffield Professors of Orthopaedic Surgery:

- 1937–1940 Gathorne Robert Girdlestone
- 1940–1948 Herbert John Seddon
- 1949–1966 Josep Trueta
- 1966–1992 Robert Duthie
- 1992–2001 John Kenwright
- 2001–present Andrew J. Carr

== See also ==
- List of hospitals in England
