= Josep Trueta =

Catalan scientist

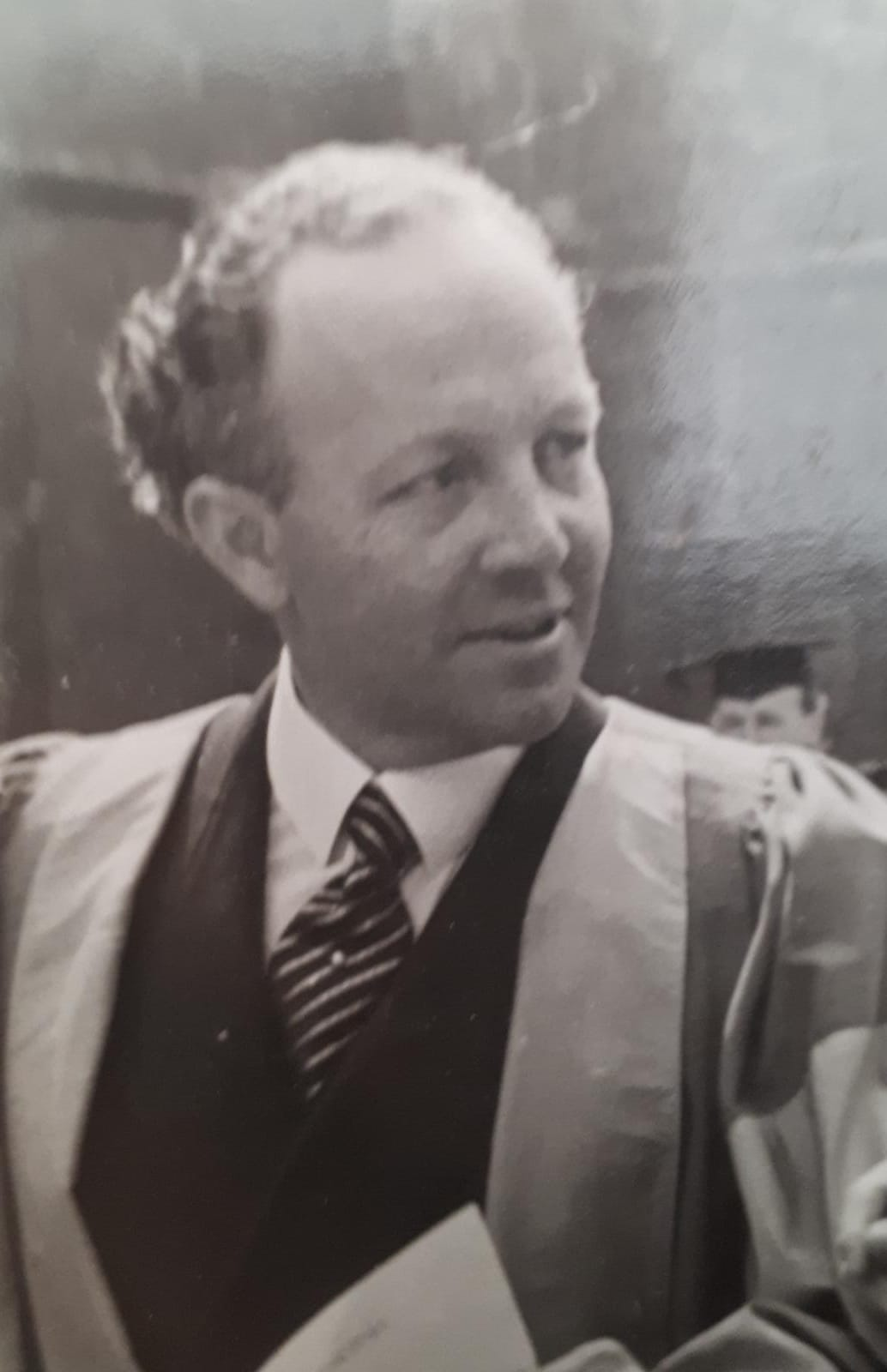
- Born: 27 October 1897; Barcelona, Spain
- Died: 19 January 1977 (aged 79); Barcelona, Spain
- Scientific career
- Fields: medicine
- Workplaces: University of Oxford

Josep Trueta i Raspall (Catalan pronunciation: [ʒuˈzɛp tɾuˈɛtə]; 27 October 1897 – 19 January 1977) was a Catalan surgeon and researcher.

== Biography ==
Born in the Poblenou neighbourhood of Barcelona, Trueta came from a progressive minded family with medical and military backgrounds (his father was a doctor, his grandfather a military officer and his great-grandfather an Army surgeon). In his youth he felt called to an artistic career, being very keen on painting, and excelled in sports like fencing, but ended up studying medicine in the University of Barcelona. In the 1920s he temporarily moved to Vienna to further his studies and it was there that he focused on the development and application of innovative techniques for bone treatments, being considered because of this one of the fathers of modern traumatology.

He started applying his methodologies for the treatment of workplace accidents, being hired as Chief Surgeon for the "Caja de Previsión y Socorro", an insurance company that treated 40.000 accident victims annually. In 1934 he developed the "Método Trueta", a technique for the treatment of wounded soldiers in the battlefield. His technique was initially considered too risky to be implemented in battlefield conditions and lacked support from other doctors. In 1935 he was named Director of the Surgery service at the Hospital de Sant Pau in Barcelona, a position he held during the Spanish Civil War. During the war, he applied his innovative methods and achieved a significant reduction in bone fracture related infections and a 90% reduction of gangrene cases. In 1938, having treated more than 600 battle related fractures without having to resort to a single amputation, he published his first medical text, the booklet "Treatment of War Fractures".

As a Catalan nationalist, he fled into exile, first to Perpignan and from there, after being contacted by the Foreign Office, to England. In 1939 an English translation of his 1938 booklet was published as Treatment of War Wounds and Fractures, with special reference to the Closed Method as used in the war in Spain, in London. His work was noted and accepted by the British RAMC, thus influencing British Army medical practice. During World War II, he helped to organize medical emergency services. His use of a new plaster cast method for the treatment of open wounds and fractures helped save a great number of lives and still more limbs, during several wars.

Trueta formed part of a group of Catalans exiled in the United Kingdom who denounced the situation of Catalonia in Francoist Spain. He wrote The Spirit of Catalonia, a book aimed at explaining Catalan history to English-speaking society. In 1948, Trueta was a delegate in the European Congress of the Hague and one of the promoters of the Catalan Delegation of the pro-European movement.

He joined the team run by Florey and Chain that developed penicillin in Oxford, and held the first live animal to be injected with the groundbreaking antibiotic.

From 1949 to 1966 he was the third Nuffield Professor of Orthopaedic Surgery at the University of Oxford and directed the Nuffield Orthopaedic Centre (previously the Wingfield-Morris Hospital).

During his career he published 20 books and more than 200 articles not just on surgical techniques, but also on bone development, the treatment of polio or renal circulation.

On his retirement in 1966, he returned to Catalonia with his wife Amèlia. Both were buried (in 1977 and 1975 respectively) in Santa Cristina d'Aro.

The main hospital of Girona, Josep Trueta University Hospital, was named after him, as are streets in many towns across Catalonia. Every year the government of Catalonia awards Trueta medals and plaques to professionals and institutions that excel in the Catalan medical field.

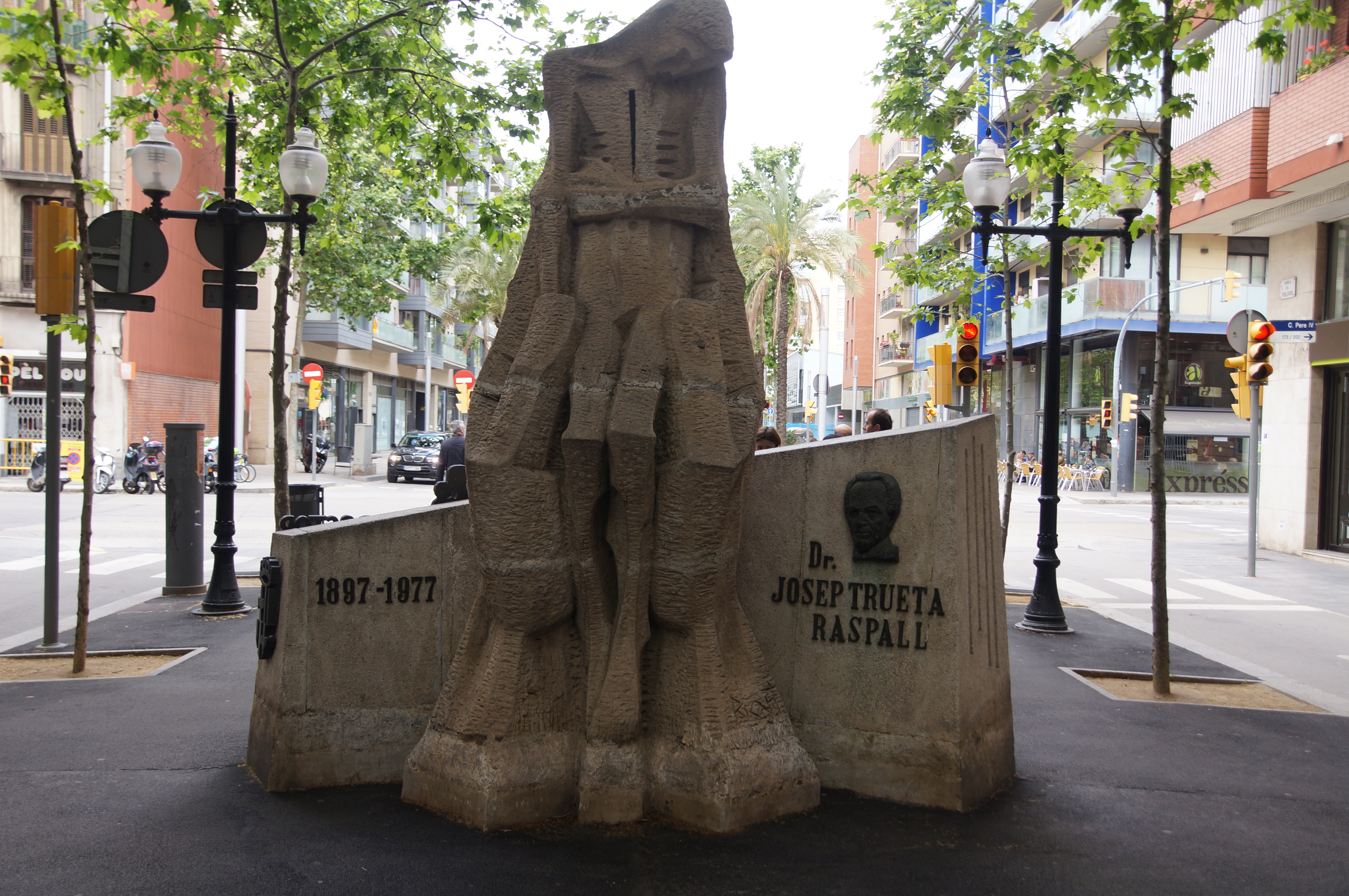
Monument to Trueta in Barcelona
