= Josep Trueta University Hospital =

Coordinates: 41.99757°N 2.81997°E

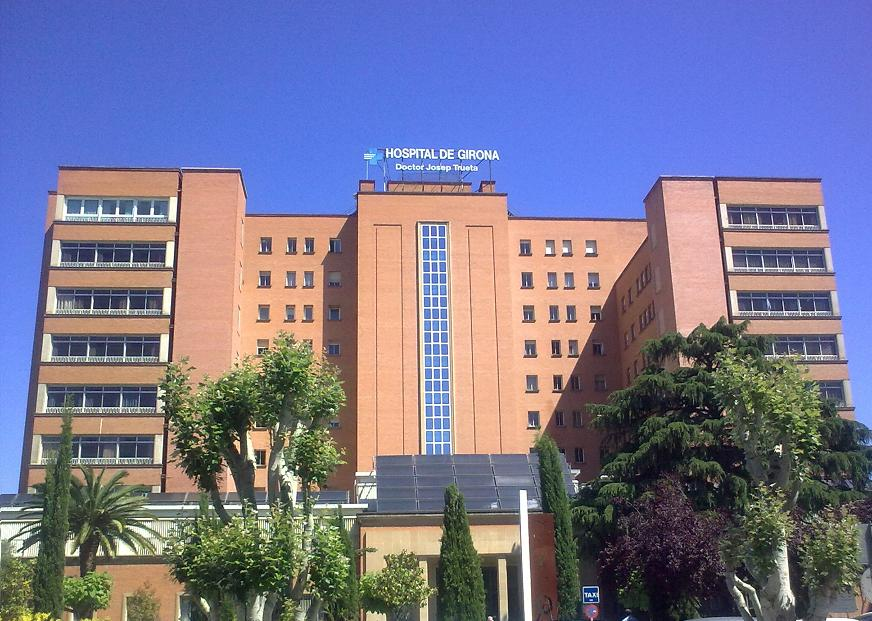
- View of the hospital from the main entrance

Geography
- Location: Girona, Catalonia, Spain

Organisation
- Care system: Institut Català de la Salut
- Type: General

History
- Opened: 1956

Links
- Website: http://icsgirona.cat/ca/hospitaltrueta

The Josep Trueta University Hospital (Catalan: Hospital Universitari de Girona Doctor Josep Trueta, Spanish: Hospital Universitario Doctor Josep Trueta) is a public hospital in the city of Girona in Catalonia. It was opened on 13 April 1956 in honour of the Catalan surgeon Josep Trueta. The hospital has several departments, but most notably an emergency department, an ICU with almost 100 beds and its own oncology wing.

The hospital is managed by the Catalan public health authority, CatSalut.

== History ==
The hospital began construction six years before opening in 1956. The hospital has since been renovated several times and three additional buildings have been added to the complex. When created, the Hospital remained managed by the Spanish Health Authority under the rule of the Franco dictatorship of Spain. After the transition of power from the Spanish government to the Catalan government, the hospital officially changed its language and name to Catalan and became a teaching hospital with its own School of Medicine and residentship program.

== Departments and specialties ==
- Allergy Treatment
- Anesthetics and Resuscitation
- Blood and Tissue Bank
- Cardiac Surgery
- Cardiology
- Care continuity unit
- Clinical Laboratory
- Clinical Hematology
- Dermatology
- Digestology
- Emergency Medicine
- Endocrinology
- General and Digestive Surgery
- Hospital pharmacy
- Intensive Care Medicine
- Internal Medicine and Infectious Diseases
- Maxillofacial surgery
- Medical Oncology (ICO)
- Medical Physics and Radiological Protection
- Nephrology
- Neurology
- Neurophysiology
- Neurosurgery
- Obstetrics and Gynecology
- Ophthalmology
- Orthopedic and Traumatological Surgery
- Otorhinolaryngology
- Pathological Anatomy
- Pediatric Surgery
- Pediatrics
- Plastic Surgery
- Pulmonology
- Radiology
- Radiotherapy Oncology (ICO)
- Rehabilitation
- Rheumatology
- Thoracic Surgery
- Urology
- Vascular Surgery
