= Peter Robinson =

Peter Robinson may refer to:

== Entertainment ==
- Peter Robinson (sideshow artist) (1874–1947), American actor and sideshow performer, known for his appearance in film Freaks (1932)
- J. Peter Robinson (born 1945), British musician and film score composer
- Peter Robinson (conductor) (born 1949), British conductor
- Peter Robinson (novelist) (1950–2022), British-born Canadian crime writer
- Pete McCarthy (Peter Charles McCarthy Robinson, 1951–2004), British comedian
- Peter Robinson (poet) (born 1953), British poet and professor
- Peter Robinson (New Zealand musician) (1958–2016), New Zealand musician
- Peter Robinson (artist) (born 1966), New Zealand artist of Maori descent
- Peter Robinson (Australian musician), founder of Australian band The Strangers
- Peter Manning Robinson, film score composer, see The Maddening
- Peter Robinson or Marilyn (singer) (born 1962), British pop singer
- Peter Robinson or Chris Spedding (born 1944), English guitarist and record producer

== Politics ==
- Peter Robinson (Canadian politician) (1785–1838)
- Peter Robinson (New York politician) (1791–1841), American politician in New York state
- Peter Robinson (Northern Ireland politician) (born 1948), Northern Irish politician
- Pete Robinson (Georgia state politician), in 138th to 140th Georgia General Assembly (1985–90)

== Sports ==
- Peter Robinson (Australian footballer) (born 1953), Australian rules footballer
- Peter Robinson (cricketer, born 1929) (1929–2023), English cricketer
- Peter Robinson (cricketer, born 1943), English cricketer
- Pete Robinson (drag racer) (1933–1971), American drag racer
- Peter Robinson (footballer, born 1922) (1922–2000), English footballer
- Peter Robinson (footballer, born 1957), English footballer
- Peter Robinson (rugby league) (born 1976), Australian rugby league footballer and commentator
- Peter Robinson (speedway rider) (1919–1991), English motorcycle speedway rider

== Other professions ==
- Peter D. Robinson (born 1969), English bishop
- Peter Frederick Robinson (1776–1858), British architect
- Peter Robinson (chancellor), Canadian academic, see List of Canadian university leaders
- Peter Robinson (computer scientist) (born 1952), English academic and computer scientist
- Peter Robinson (journalist) (born 1977), British music journalist
- Peter Robinson (lawyer) (born 1953), American lawyer
- Peter Robinson (priest) (born 1961), archdeacon of Lindisfarne
- Peter Robinson (speechwriter) (born 1957), American speechwriter and interviewer
- Peter Robinson (photographer) (born 1944), British sports photographer
- Peter Robinson (linguist), British linguist and scholar of second language acquisition
- Peter Robinson (1804–1874), British founder of the Peter Robinson department store chain
- E. A. Robinson (born 1933), known as Peter, chemist and former principal of the University of Toronto Mississauga

== Other uses ==
- Peter Robinson (department store)
