= Robert Baker Girdlestone =

- Born: 3 October 1836
- Died: 1923 (aged 86–87)

Academic background
- Education: Christ Church, Oxford

Academic work
- Discipline: Hebrew studies
- Institutions: Wycliffe Hall, Oxford
- Notable works: Synonyms of the Old Testament

Robert Baker Girdlestone (1836–1923) was an Anglican cleric who ministered at St John's Downshire Hill, Hampstead. He studied at Charterhouse, London, and Christ Church, Oxford, and was first principal of Wycliffe Hall, Oxford. A Hebrew scholar and head of the translation department of the British and Foreign Bible Society, he is best known for his reference work Synonyms of the Old Testament.

== Life ==
Robert Baker Girdlestone was the seventh son of Charles Girdlestone, a Fellow of Balliol College, Oxford. R. B. Girdlestone was minister of St. John's Downshire Hill, Hampstead, then head of the translation department of the British and Foreign Bible Society, and first principal of Wycliffe Hall, Oxford, in the post from 1877 to 1889.

== Family ==
His third son Gathorne Robert Girdlestone (1881–1950) was the first Nuffield Professor of Orthopaedic Surgery, and thereby the first professor of orthopaedics in Britain.

== Works ==
- Synonyms of the Old Testament
- The Student’s Deuteronomy
- How to Study the English Bible
- The Foundations of the Bible: Studies in Old Testament Criticism
- Old Testament Theology and Modern Ideas
- Deuterographs: Duplicate Passages in the Old Testament, their Bearing on the Text and Compilation of the Hebrew Scriptures
- Doctor doctorum : the Teacher and the Book; with some remarks on Old Testament criticism
- English Church Teaching on Faith, Life and Order
- Grammar of Prophecy
- Dies Irae: the judgement of the great day, viewed in the light of scripture and conscience (1869)
- The Final Judgment and Future Prospects of Mankind (1872)

Academic offices
Preceded by	Principal of Wycliffe Hall, Oxford; 1877-1889	Succeeded by
