= Gathorne Robert Girdlestone =

British orthopaedic surgeon

- Portrait drawing of Gathorne Robert Girdlestone by William Rothenstein (1872–1945); sanguine and white chalk, c. 1899-1938, collection of the National Portrait Gallery, London
- Born: 1881
- Died: 1950 (aged 68–69)
- Scientific career
- Fields: orthopaedic surgery
- Institutions: Nuffield Orthopaedic Centre

Gathorne Robert Girdlestone (1881–1950), often known as GRG, was a pioneering orthopaedic surgeon, the founder of the Nuffield Orthopaedic Centre, and the first Nuffield Professor of orthopaedic surgery at the University of Oxford.

== Life ==
Girdlestone was born in 1881, the son of Robert Baker Girdlestone, Canon of Christ Church, Oxford and first principal of Wycliffe Hall, Oxford. He went to Charterhouse and then to New College, Oxford.

He died on 30 December 1950.

== Work ==
In 1943 Girdlestone described the femoral head ostectomy – also known as the femoral head and neck ostectomy or Girdlestone procedure – an orthopaedic operation intended to rescue hip joints in humans in cases of severe damage, often through hip dysplasia or arthritis. In the twenty-first century the technique is commonly used in veterinary surgery and in humans in areas of the world where resources are limited.

== Recognition ==
There are two roads near the Nuffield Orthopaedic Centre in Oxford names after Gathorne Girdlestone: Gathorne Road and Girdlestone Road. It is difficult to know whether he would have been pleased with this honour, as he had refused to allow the Wingfield Hospital to bear his name. The Girdlestone Memorial Library (one of the Bodleian Libraries) at the Nuffield Orthopaedic Centre is named after him.

== Publications ==
Book publications include:

- The Diagnosis & Treatment of Tuberculosis of the Hip. London: Humphrey Milford, 1925.
- The Care and Cure of Crippled Children. The scheme of the Central Committee for the Care of Cripples. Bristol: J. Wright & Sons, 1925.
- Tuberculosis of Bone and Joint. London: Milford, 1940.
- A Regional Orthopaedic Service, and its association with the accident services of the region. Oxford: Hall the Printer, [1949]

His published articles include:

- Gathorne Robert Girdlestone (1928). Arthrodesis and other operations for tuberculosis of the hip. In: The Robert Jones Birthday Volume: A collection of surgical essays. London: Humphrey Milford; Oxford: Oxford University Press. pp. 347–374.
- ——— (1943). Acute pyogenic arthritis of the hip: an operation giving free access and effective drainage. Lancet. 241: 419–421.
