= Thomas Girdlestone =

English physician and writer

Thomas Girdlestone (Holt, Norfolk, 1758 – 25 June 1822) was an English physician and writer.

== Education and career ==
After a classical education at Gresham's School, Holt, Girdlestone joined the army as a surgeon's mate, serving under Colonel Sir Charles Stuart, governor of Menorca, and in India. In 1787 he entered Leiden University to study medicine, and after qualifying settled at Great Yarmouth, Norfolk, where he practised as a doctor, wrote books on medicine, and was also a publisher.

It has been suggested that Girdlestone first advocated arsenic salts as a treatment for psoriasis and leprosy in 1806, but arsenical preparations have been used for skin diseases since the time of Galen.

In appearance, Girdlestone was tall and thin, liked to dress in black, with a white cravat, silk stockings and half-gaiters. He had a powdered head and pigtail and carried a gold-headed cane.

== Publications ==
- Essays on the Hepatitis and Spasmodic Affections in India: founded on observations made whilst on service with his Majesty's troops in different parts of that country (1787)
- A Case of Diabetes, with an Historical Sketch of that Disease (printed by I.D. Downes, for G.G. and J. Robinson, London, 1799)
- The Odes of Anacreon (translation, 1803)
- Fowler's Solution (1806)
- Facts tending to prove that General Lee was never Absent from this Country for any Length of Time during the Years 1767, 1768, 1769, 1770, 1771, 1772, and that he was the Author of Junius (1813)

== Family ==
Girdlestone married the widow of the Reverend John Close, and they had one son.
