= Stephen Simon =

Stephen Anthony Simon (May 3, 1937 – January 20, 2013) was an American conductor, composer, and arranger. He was a noted proponent of the music of George Frederic Handel, serving as music director of the Handel Society of New York and recording several of Handel's operas and oratorios for the RCA label. Simon also became known for his pioneering programming of works for orchestra and narrator for young people, including his own Casey at the Bat and The Tortoise and the Hare.

== Life and career ==
Simon was the adopted son of Leo and Esther Annenberg Simon and the nephew of the publishing magnate and philanthropist Walter Annenberg. He was born and grew up in New York City, attending Dalton and Riverdale Schools. After one year at Oberlin College, Simon transferred to Yale University where he received a Bachelor of Music degree in 1960. He went on to study independently with Josef Krips.

According to The Washington Post, Simon was a jazz enthusiast in college and found it had a similar "exhilarating improvisational quality" to that of classical music. In 1972 he had told The New York Times:

There is a close link between jazz and Baroque music because of improvisation. [...] Knowing the style makes you feel secure and then you can do anything — even if it doesn't always work — and that's exciting.

From 1970 to 1974 Simon served as music director of the Handel Society of New York with whom he made several recordings, presented an annual Handel Festival at Carnegie Hall, and toured to Europe. He also served as music director of the Handel Festival at Carnegie Hall at the Kennedy Center in Washington, DC, conducting American premieres of such works as Poro, Radimisto, Orlando and Alessandro as well as such works as Semele. Samson, Saul, Solomon and Judas Maccabaeus. His recording of Handel’s oratorio Solomon with the Vienna Volksoper Orchestra earned a Grammy Award nomination in 1969 for best choral recording. Handel scholar Donald Burrows noted that Simon was one of the pioneers in assembling performers to record large scale works such as Solomon.

As a symphony conductor, Simon was known for his innovative programming. From 1970-1982, he was the creator and music director of "Summer of Music on the Hudson" in Tarrytown, New York with outdoor concerts on the lawns of the Lyndhurst, the Jay Gould Estate overlooking the Hudson.

In 1976 Simon settled in Washington, DC. where he founded and led the Handel Festival Orchestra which later became the Washington Chamber Symphony, the resident chamber orchestra at the Kennedy Center for the Performing Arts. In addition to its regular season, the orchestra toured the US and Europe. In 1988, Simon with his second wife Bonnie Ward Simon, created a series of concerts for young people played by the Washington Chamber Symphony. Their Stories in Music project created and discovered new works for narrator and orchestra and eventually led to their founding the recording label Maestro Classics. The label produced the Stories in Music series of recordings for children and their parents, recorded with the London Philharmonic Orchestra.

In his later years, Simon was the founding music director of the Simon Sinfonietta in Falmouth, Massachusetts which performed at Falmouth Academy during the winter months from 2004 to 2013. He was also the music director of L'Orchestre des Portes Rouges, a chamber orchestra that performed at the Church of the Resurrection in Manhattan from 2011 to 2013.

Simon died in New York City from a stroke at the age of 75. His first marriage to Ellen Friendly Simon, with whom he had four sons and four grandchildren, ended in divorce. He married Bonnie Ward Simon in 1978. The couple had two sons.

== Discography ==
- The Complete Mozart Piano Concerti – Lili Kraus (pianist), Vienna Festival Orchestra, Stephen Simon (conductor). 12 LP Records. Label: Epic (recorded in 1965 & 1966; digitally remastered and re-issued as a 12-CD boxed set on Sony Classical in 2017)
- The Complete Beethoven Piano Concertos – Anthony Newman (fortepianist), Philomusica Antiqua London, Stephen Simon (conductor). Label: Newport Classics
- Handel: Solomon (complete) – Vienna Volksopera Orchestra, Vienna Akademiechor, Stephen Simon (conductor), Endich (soloist), Brooks (soloist), Young (soloist), John Shirley-Quirk (soloist). Label: RCA
- Handel: Orlando (complete) – Vienna Volksopera Orchestra, Stephen Simon (conductor), Martin Isepp, (harpsichord), Sofia Steffan (Orlando), Graziella Sciutti (Angelica), Bernadette Greevy (Medoro), Carole Bogard (Dorinda), Marius Rintzler (Zoroaster). Label: RCA
- Handel: Ariodante (complete) – Vienna Volksopera Orchestra, Vienna Akademiechor, Stephen Simon (conductor). Label: RCA
- Handel: Rinaldo (highlights) – Vienna Volksopera Orchestra, Stephen Simon (conductor), Arleen Auger (Almirena), Beverly Wolff (Rinaldo), Raymond Michalski (Argante), Rita Shane (Armida) Label: RCA
- Hallelujah Handel (choruses from 13 oratorios) – Handel Festival Orchestra of Washington, Howard University Chorus, Stephen Simon (conductor). Label: Arabesque
- Tartini Violin Concerti in G Minor and A Major – Washington Chamber Symphony, Jody Gatwood, (soloist), Stephen Simon (conductor). Label: Musical Heritage Society
- Great Handel Oboe Concerti and Overtures – Washington Chamber Symphony, Stephen Simon (conductor). Label: Musical Heritage Society

=== Stories in Music series ===
The following were all recorded with the London Philharmonic Orchestra conducted by Stephen Simon and released on the Maestro Classics label.

- Mike Mulligan and His Steam Shovel – Stephen Simon (composer), Konrad Czynski ("Yadu"), (narrator), Bonnie Simon (elucidator)
- Casey at the Bat – Stephen Simon (composer), Konrad Czynski ("Yadu"), (narrator), Bonnie Simon (elucidator)
- Juanita the Spanish Lobster – David Haslam (composer), Konrad Czynski ("Yadu"), (narrator), Bonnie Simon (elucidator). Also released in Spanish as Juanita la langosta española with Rosi Amador as narrator.
- The Sorcerer's Apprentice (narrated version) – Paul Dukas (composer), Konrad Czynski ("Yadu"), (narrator), Bonnie Simon (elucidator).
- The Story of Swan Lake (narrated version) – Tchaikovsky (composer), Konrad Czynski ("Yadu"), (narrator), Bonnie Simon (elucidator).
- Peter and the Wolf – Prokofiev (composer), Konrad Czynski ("Yadu"), (narrator), Bonnie Simon (elucidator)
- Tortoise and the Hare – Stephen Simon (composer), Konrad Czynski ("Yadu"), (narrator), Bonnie Simon (elucidator)
- My Name is Handel: The Story of Water Music – Handel (composer), Konrad Czynski ("Yadu"), (narrator), Bonnie Simon (elucidator)
- The Soldier's Tale (Histoire du soldat) – Stravinsky (composer), Konrad Czynski ("Yadu"), (narrator), Bonnie Simon (elucidator)
- Carnival of the Animals – Saint-Saëns (composer), Ogden Nash (poet), Konrad Czynski ("Yadu"), (narrator), Bonnie Simon (elucidator)
- Merry Pranks of Master Till (Till Eulenspiegel's Merry Pranks) – Richard Strauss (composer), Konrad Czynski ("Yadu"), (narrator), Bonnie Simon (elucidator)
- The Nutcracker (The Nutcracker Suite) [narrated version] – Peter Ilyich Tchaikovsky (composer), Jim Weiss, (narrator), Bonnie Simon (elucidator)
