= Washington Chamber Symphony =

The Washington Chamber Symphony (WCS) was an American chamber orchestra based in Washington, D.C. which was active during the last quarter of the 20th century. Founded in 1976 by conductor Stephen Simon, the orchestra was originally titled the Handel Festival Orchestra. Initially the orchestra was essentially the resident ensemble for the annual Handel Festival at the John F. Kennedy Center for the Performing Arts. However, as time went on the orchestra began to expand its repertoire beyond Handel into a broad range of works from a variety of musical periods, including contemporary works. When the Kennedy Center's Handel Festival ceased in 1987, the orchestra changed its name to the Washington Chamber Symphony and continued to offer an annual concert series at the Kennedy Center Terrace Theater. The orchestra disbanded suddenly in July 2002, citing post 9/11 financial difficulties as the reason.

In addition to their chamber orchestra series at the Kennedy Center, the Washington Chamber Symphony produced very popular concerts for families. Many of their "Stories in Music" concerts from the Kennedy Center Concert Hall have now been recorded with the London Philharmonic Orchestra, Stephen Simon, conductor, Yadu, narrator, under the Maestro Classics label and the series has won over 50 national awards.
