= Errol Girdlestone =

British music conductor (born 1945)

Errol Girdlestone (born 1945) is a British music conductor.

He lives in the south of France, and works from there as a freelance conductor. His local base is as Music Director of Syrinx Concerts in Vence, an organisation with a professional orchestra and two choirs - one amateur, one professional.

He read Music at Oxford University and subsequently studied conducting in Warsaw. He began his professional career in St. Paul's Cathedral choir, and as a singer in several London ensembles, including the Monteverdi Choir, Cantores in Ecclesia, and the Hilliard Ensemble, of which he was a founder member. He was later to join the music staff of the English National Opera, where he assisted Reginald Goodall on Wagner's Ring Cycle, before becoming a conductor himself - at the Cape Town Opera in South Africa.

He divides his time equally between symphonic, choral, and opera conducting. He has conducted at festivals in the UK, France, Austria, and Germany, as well as in the United States, Uruguay and South Africa.

He has a regular relationship with the Wiener Concert-Verein, the chamber edition of the Vienna Symphony Orchestra, and has conducted them in Bregenz, the Vienna Musikverein, and on tour in France.

He is also a composer, and has had symphonic works premiered in France and Monaco by François-René Duchâble, the pianist, and flautists Jean Ferrandis and Pierre Marcoul.
