= Femoral head ostectomy =

Surgical removal of the head and neck of the femur

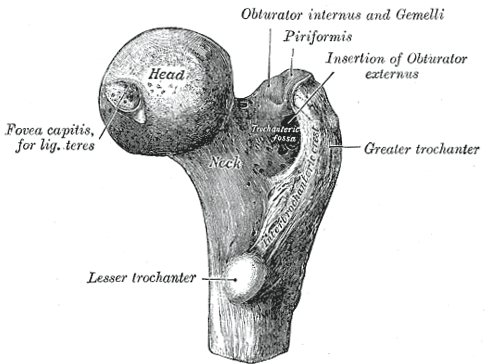
- The femoral head and neck
- Specialty: Orthopaedics

A femoral head ostectomy is a surgical operation to remove the head and neck from the femur. It is performed to alleviate pain, and is a salvage procedure, reserved for conditions where pain can not be alleviated in any other way. It is common in veterinary surgery. Other names are excision arthroplasty of the femoral head and neck, Girdlestone's operation, Girdlestone procedure, and femoral head and neck ostectomy.

== History ==
The operation was first described by Gathorne Robert Girdlestone (1881–1950) in 1945. He originally designed it for treatment of tuberculosis and other disorders of the hips. It may thus be known as a "Girdlestone operation". Other surgeons have added various modifications.

== In veterinary science ==
Use of the operation in veterinary science was first described in 1961 by J. S. A. Spreull. Dogs, cats, and small horses, donkeys and ponies have all had the procedure performed successfully. It may be used in some cases of hip dysplasia, an extremely painful congenital condition found in many dog breeds and some cats. It is also performed in cases of trauma where the head of the femur is badly broken or severed, or in response to other diseases of the hip bone, such as Legg-Calve-Perthes' disease. It is sometimes the procedure of last resort when other methods have failed or sepsis of the joint has occurred, but it can be indicated when the hip joint is severely affected or if arthritis in the joint is serious enough. It can also be indicated in small animals with pelvic fractures, particularly fractures of the acetabulum (socket of the pelvis).

Small horses and ponies can have an ostectomy without an osteotomy of the greater trochanter. As a salvage procedure, this is usually performed in those animals which have the specific injury of a fracture of the capital physis. These animals would not return to function as riding horses and the procedure may be performed for those animals involved in breeding, milking, and being kept as companion animals. The procedure can also be successfully performed in pigs.

== Procedure ==
The procedure exposes the head section of the femur bone (the ball of the ball and socket joint), and then the head is removed using a small saw or a bone hammer and chisel. Rarely both sides are done in one operation; most times one side is done and allowed to heal before the other side is done.

Unlike in most other hip joint operations, the head of the femur is not replaced, but is allowed to heal and develop its own fibrous scar tissue so that the joint is no longer bone-to-bone, a pseudoarthrosis (also called a "false joint"). The neck of the femur is usually removed at the same time as the head. This prevents the post-operative complication of bone rubbing on bone and continued pain. This has led to the procedure often being called "Femoral head and neck ostectomy".

Animals who have had the operation are required to maintain a lower weight to compensate for the loss of skeletal integrity. They typically have excellent functional outcomes with appropriate physical therapy.

== See also ==
- List of surgeries by type
