= David Horne (composer) =

Scottish composer, pianist and teacher

David Horne (born 12 December 1970) is a Scottish composer, pianist, and teacher.

A resident composer with the Royal Liverpool Philharmonic for four years, he has been awarded several commissions. His works have been performed by international calibre artists.

As an award-winning pianist, he has performed with leading British orchestras.

== Biography ==
He was born in Tillicoultry, near Stirling, in 1970. His father played piano (non-professionally) and he started learning the piano at the age of seven. Early in his life his family moved to Norway, his mother's native country. Aged eleven, he went to St Mary's Music School in Edinburgh to study piano with Audrey Innes and composition with Geoffrey King. In 1989 he moved to Philadelphia to study at the Curtis Institute, where he studied with Ned Rorem. He moved on to Harvard University, where he obtained a PhD in 1999 and became a visiting lecturer, still in his 20s. He has since returned to the United Kingdom and lives in Manchester, where he is Professor of Music and Head of Graduate School at the Royal Northern College of Music. In 2004 he led the New Music/New Media course for the Britten-Pears School. In 2006/07, he was visiting professor at the Escola Superior de Música de Catalunya.

He was composer in residence with the Royal Liverpool Philharmonic from 2000 to 2004.

As a pianist, he received the piano section BBC Young Musician of the Year award in 1988.

He has performed as soloist with orchestras including the BBC Symphony Orchestra, City of Birmingham Symphony Orchestra, London Sinfonietta, and Royal Scottish National Orchestra.

He has appeared at The Proms, making his debut in 1990 performing Prokofiev's Third Concerto and has been featured several times as a composer.

== Work ==
Horne composes concertos, orchestral, ensemble and chamber music, operas, and songs.

He received the Yorkshire Arts Association Young Composers' Competition at the Huddersfield Contemporary Music Festival for his composition Splintered Unisons, which was performed by the Prometheus Ensemble.

In 1994 he was awarded the inaugural Stephen Oliver Prize, which was worth £10,000 and given to a young composer for a new work of comic opera, for his opera Travellers. During 1997 and 1998 the Stephen Oliver Trust worked with the 1998 BOC Covent Garden Festival to achieve the performance of the winning opera (and that of the 1996 winner), and Travellers was brought to the stage in June 1998, as part of the 1998 Covent Garden Festival.

He has received commissions for compositions by soloists such as percussionist Evelyn Glennie (Reaching Out and Ignition), violist Nobuko Imai (Stilled Voices), and pianist Boris Berezovsky (Liszt), as well as a Koussevitzky Commission in 1995. He was shortlisted for the vocal category of the 2007 British Composer Awards for his work Life's Splinters.

His opera Friend of the People was premiered at the Scottish Opera in November 1999.

His works have been performed by groups such as the BBC Symphony Orchestra, the Nash Ensemble, the London Sinfonietta, the Birmingham Contemporary Music Group, the California EAR Unit, the Ensemble für neue Musik Zürich, The Chamber Music Society of Lincoln Center, the Nieuw Ensemble, Ensemble Moderne, and string quartets Mendelssohn Quartet, Yggdrasil Quartet, Daedalus Quartet and Brentano Quartet.

He is published by Boosey and Hawkes and his music has been recorded on BMG and NMC.

== Selected works ==
Stage

- Jason Field, Chamber Opera in 1 act (1993)
- Travellers, Chamber Opera in 1 act (1994)
- Beyond the Blue Horizon, Music Theatre (1996–1997)
- Friend of the People, Opera in 3 acts with a prologue (1998–1999)

Orchestral

- Flicker (1997)
- Strands (2000)
- Fixation (2001)
- Concerto for Orchestra (2003–2004)
- The Turn of the Tide for chamber orchestra (2006)
- Submergence (2007)

Concertante

- Piano Concerto (1992)
- Vapours for glass harmonica and orchestra (1994)
- Flex for piano and chamber ensemble (1997)
- Fireflies for glass harmonica and orchestra (2002)
- Ignition, Concerto for percussion and orchestra (2002)
- Double Violin Concerto for 2 violins and string orchestra (2003)
- Splintered Instruments for harp and chamber ensemble (2004)
- Phantom Instruments for clarinet and chamber ensemble (2006)

Chamber and instrumental music

- Splintered Unisons for clarinet, violin, cello and piano (1988)
- towards dharma... for flute, oboe, viola, cello and percussion (1989)
- Out of the Air for chamber ensemble (1990)
- Contraries and Progressions for flute, clarinet, violin (or viola), cello and piano (1991)
- Concerto for Six Players for flute, (piccolo), clarinet (bass clarinet), violin, cello, percussion and piano (1993)
- 3 Dirges for flute and harp (1993)
- Phantom Moon for flute (alto flute) and percussion (1993)
- Sonata for trombone and piano (1993)
- Surrendering to the Stream, String Quartet No. 1 (1993)
- Pulse for marimba solo (1994)
- Reaching Out for percussion solo (1994)
- Sparks for flute, clarinet, violin, cello and percussion (1994)
- Clarion for clarinet, trumpet, celesta, violin and double bass (1995)
- Persistence for chamber ensemble (1995)
- Stilled Voices for viola solo (1995)
- Undulations, String Quartet No. 2 (1995)
- Aureole for bassoon and digital tape (1996)
- Rush for percussion solo (1996)
- Unbound for flute, oboe, clarinet, horn, violin, viola and cello (1996)
- Filters for viola and piano (1998)
- Glow for chamber ensemble (1998)
- Shiver for violin, viola, cello, double bass and piano (1998)
- Spike for flute, bass clarinet, violin, cello, percussion and piano (1998)
- Broken Instruments for chamber ensemble (1999)
- Zip for cello and piano (1999)
- Blunt Instruments for chamber ensemble (2000)
- Elegy for trumpet and piano (2000)
- Deep Flux for bass clarinet, contrabassoon and tuba (2001)
- Five Divisions of Time for flute, oboe, clarinet, horn and bassoon (2001)
- Subterfuge for 2 violins, viola and cello (2002)
- Disembodied Instruments for chamber ensemble (2003)
- Disintegrations for chamber ensemble (2003)
- Emerging Dances for chamber ensemble (2004)
- Flight from the Labyrinth, String Quartet No. 3 (2004)
- Interrupted Serenades for 8-string guitar (2004)
- Gossamer for saxophone quartet (2004)
- Double Concerto for piano and string quartet (2005)
- String Quartet No. 4 (2006)
- Will o' the Wisp for flute and piano (2006)
- Restless Feeling for chamber ensemble (2007–2008)

Piano

- 6 Short Studies (1990)
- Nocturnes and Nightmares (1991)
- Resound for piano and digital tape (1995)
- Liszt (1996)
- Refrain (1996)
- Sostenuto for piano and digital tape (1996)

Vocal

- The Burning Babe for 2 sopranos, alto, flute, oboe, clarinet, percussion and piano (1992)
- Days Now Gone for tenor and piano (1992)
- The Letter for tenor and piano (1993)
- Lied der Mignon for soprano and piano (1997)
- Pan's Song for soprano, clarinet, violin, cello and piano (1999)
- You for soprano, alto flute/piccolo, cello and piano/claves (1999)
- Slow, Slow for tenor and piano (2000)
- Sweet Disorder for tenor and piano (2000)
- Life's Splinters for tenor and flute, clarinet, violin, viola and cello (2006)
- A Curious Thirsty Fly for tenor and piano (2008)
- Last September for baritone and orchestra (2008)

Choral

- Northscape for chamber orchestra with violin and harp obbligato and unison children's voices (optional) (1992)
- The Lie, Cantata for soprano, tenor, children's chorus and chamber ensemble (1993)
- Magnificat and Nunc Dimittis for mixed chorus and organ (1993)
- Mass for mixed chorus and organ (1995)
- Praise Ye, 2 Psalms for children's chorus and organ (1995)
- Pensive for mezzo-soprano, mixed chorus and chamber orchestra (or organ) (1998)
- The Year's Midnight for tenor, chorus and orchestra (2000)
- 2 Songs for female chorus a cappella (2003)
