= Charles Girdlestone =

English clergyman and biblical commentator

Charles Girdlestone (1797–1881) was an English clergyman and biblical commentator.

== Life ==
The second son of Samuel Rainbow Girdlestone, a chancery barrister, was born in London in March 1797; Edward Girdlestone, canon of Bristol, was his younger brother. He was educated at Tunbridge School, under Vicesimus Knox, and in 1815 entered Wadham College, Oxford, where he held two exhibitions, one for Hebrew, the other for botany. In 1818 he graduated B.A., with a first class in classics and a second in mathematics, at the same time as Edward Greswell, Josiah Forshall, and Richard Bethell, also of Wadham. He was elected to an open fellowship at Balliol College, and was appointed catechetical, logical, and mathematical lecturer in the college.

He was ordained deacon in 1820 and priest in 1821, taking his M.A. degree in the same year. About this time he became tutor to the twin sons of Sir John Stanley of Alderley Park; it was this connection which led to his being appointed rector of Alderley some years later. In 1822 he was curate at Hastings, and in 1824 at Ferry Hincksey, near Oxford. He was classical examiner for degrees at Oxford in 1825–6, and select preacher to the university in 1825 and 1830.

Shortly after his marriage (1826) he was presented by John William Ward, 4th Viscount Dudley and Ward, on the recommendation of Edward Copleston, to the vicarage of Sedgley, a parish of about 20,000 inhabitants in the south of the Stafford mining district. Here, with the assistance of his patron, he built churches, schools, and parsonages. The place suffered severely from the second cholera pandemic. There were 1,350 cases of cholera and 290 deaths in six weeks in August and September 1832.

In 1837, when Edward Stanley was appointed bishop of Norwich, Girdlestone accepted the living of Alderley, Cheshire, which the bishop vacated. The offer was made to him through the influence of his former pupil, Edward John Stanley, then under-secretary for foreign affairs. But Girdlestone became involved protracted litigation with the first Lord Stanley (patron of the living) and other landowners of the parish, caused by the Tithes Commutation Act 1836.

He passed part of 1845 and 1846 in Italy and elsewhere for his health. On his return to England he accepted the rectory of Kingswinford in the Staffordshire mining district, offered him by Lord Ward, afterwards Earl of Dudley, cousin of his former patron. Here Girdlestone had to face the second great cholera epidemic of 1849, when Kingswinford suffered severely. He resigned in 1877; at the time one of his sons was his locum tenens. He had for many years resided at Weston-super-Mare in Somerset on account of his health, where he died in April 1881, at the age of eighty-four.

== Works ==
At Oxford, as select preacher, he advocated in a sermon, afterwards published, ‘Affection between Churchmen and Dissenters,’ and in later life he spoke of ‘those noxious errors, Tractarian and Neological.’ Immediately after the epidemic of 1832 was over, Girdlestone published ‘Seven Sermons preached during the prevalence of Cholera,’ with a map of the district, and a preface giving an account of the visitation and of the religious impressions produced by it at the time upon the people. In 1843–4 he was one of the earliest supporters of the Metropolitan Association for Improving the Dwellings of the Industrial Classes, and in 1845 he published twelve ‘Letters on the Unhealthy Condition of the Lower Class of Dwellings,’ founded on the official reports recently issued by the poor law commissioners and the health of towns commission.

His major work was his commentary on the Bible, which occupied him for several years. The New Testament was first published in 2 vols., 1832–5, the Old Testament in 4 vols., 1842. A new edition, in 6 vols., was published in 1873. He published also eleven small volumes of sermons and several single ones. On one occasion Girdlestone heard one of them read from the pulpit by a preacher who was quite unconscious of the author's presence.

Later in life he sided with the evangelicals and conservatives, though as advocate of church reform and reform of convocation, of revision of the prayer-book and also of the authorised version of the Bible. Other works were:

- Two volumes of ‘Devotions for Family Use and for Private Use,’ 1835.
- Two volumes of ‘Select Hymns for Public Use and for Private Use,’ 1835.
- Twenty-eight numbers of ‘Sedgley Church Tracts,’ 1831–6.
- ‘Concordance to the Prayer Book Version of the Psalms,’ 1834.
- The Bible version and the prayer-book version of the Psalms, in parallel columns, 1836.
- ‘Questions of the Day, by the Creature of an Hour,’ 1857 (anonymous).
- ‘Christendom, sketched from History in the Light of Holy Scripture,’ 1870.
- ‘Number, a Link between Divine Intelligence and Human,’ 1875.
- ‘Thoughts on Dying Daily,’ 1878.
- An expurgated edition of ‘Horace with English notes of a Christian tendency, for the Use of Schools,’ in conjunction with the Rev. W. A. Osborne, 1848.

== Family ==
In 1826 he married Anne Elizabeth, only daughter of Baker Morrell, esq., solicitor to the university of Oxford, who survived him about a year. By her he had one daughter, who died in infancy, and eight sons, of whom seven survived him, the sixth, Robert Baker Girdlestone, being principal of Wycliffe Hall, Oxford, from 1877 to 1889.
