= Peter Robinson (conductor) =

English conductor

Peter Leslie Robinson (born 24 June 1949) is an English conductor, principally of opera. His repertoire ranges from baroque to contemporary, with a special interest in Italian opera of the 19th and early 20th centuries. His appointments have included Resident Conductor of The Australian Opera, Assistant Music Director of English National Opera and Artistic Director of British Youth Opera.

== Early life ==
He was born in Hartlepool, Co. Durham and attended West Hartlepool Grammar School. Before studying music at St John's College, Oxford, where he was Organ Scholar, he spent a year as Assistant Organist of Durham Cathedral. While at Oxford he conducted many operas and concerts, including Britten's War Requiem, Tippett's A Child of Our Time, and the premiere of Stephen Oliver's The Duchess of Malfi for Oxford University Opera Club.

== Career ==
He began his operatic career as Chorus Master at Glyndebourne, followed by several years as Head of Music Staff and Resident Conductor with The Australian Opera in Sydney. He returned to London to become Assistant Music Director at English National Opera, where his repertoire included Die Meistersinger von Nürnberg, Otello, Rigoletto, Carmen, Maria Stuarda, L'Orfeo, Hansel & Gretel, The Turn of the Screw, and all the major Mozart operas. He was the first conductor of Jonathan Miller's production of The Mikado at the London Coliseum, which he also recorded for CD and television. He returned to ENO to conduct the 25th Anniversary performances and, most recently, to conduct 'Marvellous Miller', a celebration of the director's forty-year collaboration with the company.

He has returned to Australia many times, conducting for the Australian Opera, Opera Queensland, West Australian Opera and the State Opera of South Australia, in repertoire including Aida, Andrea Chenier, La Bohème, La Fanciulla del West, Madama Butterfly, Otello, La Traviata and Turandot.

Other work abroad includes Edmonton Opera (Canada), Opera Zuid (Netherlands), Musica nel Chiostro (Batignano) and Hong Kong Academy of Performing Arts.

In the UK, he has also conducted for Kent Opera (Don Giovanni, The Beggar's Opera), English Touring Opera (The Cunning Little Vixen) and Scottish Opera (Falstaff and Les Pecheurs de Perles). For several years he worked alongside director David Freeman, conducting his productions of Madama Butterfly, Carmen, Tosca and Aida, which were revived many times by promoter Raymond Gubbay at the Royal Albert Hall. A production of Leoncavallo's Zazà. in 2017 will mark his 15th consecutive appearance at Opera Holland Park, where he has conducted L'Amore dei Tre Re, I Gioielli della Madonna, La Gioconda, La Wally, Andrea Chenier, Falstaff, Luisa Miller, Rigoletto, Un Ballo in Maschera, Fidelio, Norma and The Queen of Spades. In July 2017, Robinson conducted Verdi's Requiem for Opera Holland Park in aid of the victims of the Grenfell Fire.

For eight years he was Artistic Director of British Youth Opera, for which he has conducted 10 operas, including Paul Bunyan, The Bartered Bride, La Bohème, The Rake's Progress and English Eccentrics

== Concerts and broadcasts ==
On the concert platform has worked with most of the major British orchestras, and has appeared regularly with the BBC Concert Orchestra in radio broadcasts and on television. His long association with the British soprano Lesley Garrett resulted in three CD recordings (Simple Gifts, Lesley Garrett and I Will Wait for You), the TV special Viva la Diva, two BBC television series and many concerts across the UK and in Sydney, Australia.

Also for television, he has conducted Jonathan Miller's productions of Così fan tutte and The Mikado and, for Channel 4, The Marriage of Figaro.

== Teaching and coaching ==
In addition to his work as a performer, he teaches and coaches singers regularly at the National Opera Studio, the Royal Opera House's Jette Parker Young Artists' Programme, and the Guildhall School, as well as the Royal College of Music, and the Royal Academy of Music where he was recently elected Hon ARAM. He has conducted student performances of Curlew River, Gianni Schicchi, Suor Angelica (RAM), a triple bill of Massenet and Martinu (Guildhall School), The Rape of Lucretia (GSMD), Werther (RNCM) and Le Nozze di Figaro (Hong Kong Academy of Performing Arts).
