= Edward Girdlestone =

English cleric

Edward Girdlestone (6 September 1805 – 4 December 1884) was an English cleric, who became known as "The Agricultural Labourers' Friend" for his activism of the late 1860s and early 1870s.

== Life ==
He was the youngest son of Samuel Rainbow Girdlestone, a chancery barrister, born in London 6 September 1805, and younger brother of Charles Girdlestone. He matriculated at Balliol College, Oxford, 10 June 1822, and in 1823 was admitted a scholar of his college, became B.A. in 1826, M.A. in 1829, and was ordained to the curacy of Deane, Lancashire, in 1828. Having taken priest's orders he became vicar of Deane in 1830.

Lord-chancellor Cranworth conferred on Girdlestone in 1854 the place of canon residentiary of Bristol Cathedral, and he consequently succeeded to the vicarage of St. Nicholas with St. Leonard, Bristol, in 1855. He resigned it in 1858 for the vicarage of Wapley with Codrington, Gloucestershire. In 1862 he became vicar of Halberton, Devon, and ultimately in March 1872 vicar of Olveston, near Almondsbury, Bristol.

At Halberton, Girdlestone saw rural deprivation. In 1867 he became active on behalf of agricultural labourers, and at a meeting of the British Association at Norwich in 1868 he proposed an agricultural labourers' trade union. He spoke and organised on behalf of this project. He helped 600 agricultural families move from the west of England, where work was scarce and poorly paid, to the north.

On a journey to visit Sandringham House, Girdlestone fell ill, and he died in the canon's house, Bristol, 4 December 1884. He was buried in the graveyard of Bristol Cathedral, on 9 December.

The noted Historian W. G. Hoskins lamented the lack of notice given to Canon Girdlestones achievements. In a section on the plight of farm labourers in Devon in the 19th century, having noted the usual attitude of the foxhunting "squarsons" He writes "Yet these are the men the sentimentalists perpetually write about. Rarely does one see the name Canon Girdlestone mentioned. For everyone in Devon who has heard his name, there must be a hundred who know the name of the futile Parson Jack Russell (priest) and the infamous John Froude of Knowstone."

== Works ==
Girdlestone was the author of:

- Sermons, 1843, etc., eight pamphlets.
- The Committee of Council on Education, an imaginary Enemy, a real Friend, 1850.
- G. Marsh, the Martyr of Deane, 1851.
- Sermons on Romanism and Tractarianism, 1851.
- The Education Question, 1852.
- Apostolical Succession neither proved matter of fact nor revealed in the Bible nor the Doctrine of the Church of England, 1857.
- Reflected Truth, or the Image of God lost in Adam restored in Jesus Christ, 1859.
- Remarks on "Essays and Reviews", 1861.
- Revelation and Reason, a lecture, 1883.

== Family ==
Girdlestone married in 1832 Mary, eldest daughter of Thomas Ridgway of Wallsuches, in Deane parish. They had seven sons and four daughters. They included:

- Charles Edward Ridgway (born 1839), Indian Civil Service.
- Henry, second son, died 1865 at sea, age 23.
- Frederick Kennedy Wilson, fourth son, barrister.
- Mariden, youngest daughter, married 1871 Henry Dalzell Nourse, barrister.
