= Stephen Oliver (composer) =

English composer (1950–1992)

Stephen Michael Harding Oliver (10 March 1950 – 29 April 1992) was an English composer, best known for his operas.

== Early life and education ==
Oliver was born on 10 March 1950 in Chester, a son of Charlotte Hester (née Girdlestone; born 1911-2006), a religious education adviser, and Osborne George Oliver (b. 1903-2001), an electricity board official. His maternal great-grandfather was William Boyd Carpenter, a Bishop of Ripon and a court chaplain to Queen Victoria.

Oliver was educated at St Paul's Cathedral School, Ardingly College and at Worcester College, Oxford, where he read music under Kenneth Leighton and Robert Sherlaw Johnson. His first opera, The Duchess of Malfi (1971), was staged while he was still at Oxford.

== Career ==
Later works include incidental music for the Royal Shakespeare Company (including The Life and Adventures of Nicholas Nickleby), a musical, Blondel (1983; with Tim Rice), and over forty operas, including Tom Jones (1975), Beauty and the Beast (1984) and Timon of Athens (1991). Oliver also wrote music for television, including several of the BBC's Shakespeare productions (Timon among those), the soundtrack to the 1986 film Lady Jane, and some chamber and instrumental music.

He was a good friend of Simon Callow who commissioned the piece Ricercare No. 4 for vocal quartet Cantabile. He also composed the score for the thirteen-hour radio dramatisation of Tolkien's The Lord of the Rings, first broadcast on BBC Radio 4 in 1981. The work combined a main theme with many sub-themes, all composed within the English pastoral tradition.

In Tony Palmer's film Wagner (1982–83), Oliver can be seen playing the part of conductor Hans Richter and conducting in the pit of Richard Wagner's theatre at Bayreuth.

== Other activities ==
Oliver was a frequent guest on BBC Radio 4's light discussion programme Stop the Week.

== Death and legacy ==
He died in London on 29 April 1992, aged 42, of AIDS-related complications.

In 2006, Oliver's archive of original scores and papers was presented to the British Library by his family.

His nephew is comedian and TV host John Oliver.

=== Stephen Oliver Trust ===
Oliver left most of his estate in trust, to further the work he had already been doing during his life, helping to fund small-scale opera companies and young composers of opera. In March 1993 the Stephen Oliver Trust was established, which was enlarged by several large donations and covenants. Trustees include conductor Jane Glover and composer Jonathan Dove. The stated aims of the trust are:

- to encourage the creation, promotion and performance of contemporary opera; and
- to encourage young people working in contemporary opera.

The trust established the Stephen Oliver Prize, a biennial award of £10,000 launched in 1994, awarded to given to a young composer for a new work of comic opera. Launched in 1994, there were two prizes awarded, with the first awarded to David Horne for Travellers, and the second in 1996 to Tim Benjamin, for The Bridge. The trust worked with other organisations to bring the two composers' operas to the stage in June 1998, as part of the 1998 Covent Garden Festival.

After the competitions, the trust turned its attention to supporting compositions and occasional performances by contemporary opera companies. In 2006, the trustees decided to lodge the capital funds within the Countess of Munster Musical Trust, which administers the Stephen Oliver Award, as well as other funding to young musicians.

== Work list ==
=== Opera and music theatre ===
The following operatic or musical theatre works were performed, according to Grove. Libretto is by the composer unless otherwise given:

- All the Tea in China (1969) one act, libretto by L. du Garde Peach
- Slippery Soules (1969, revised 1976) 50 minutes
- A Phoenix too frequent (1970) one act, libretto Christopher Fry
- The Duchess of Malfi (1971, revised 1978) three acts, based on the play by John Webster
- The Dissolute Punished (1972) four one-act operas
- The Donkey (1973) one act, libretto David Pountney
- Three Instant Operas (1973)
- Past Tense (1974) two one-act operas
- Bad Times (1975) 8 minutes
- Tom Jones (1975) three acts, after the novel by Henry Fielding
- The Great McPorridge Disaster (1976) one act
- The Waiter's Revenge (1976) 20 minutes
- The Garden (1977) one act
- Jacko's Play (1980) one-act operetta
- A Man of Feeling (1980) 20 minutes, based on short story by Arthur Schnitzler
- Sasha (1982) three acts, based on play by Alexander Ostrovsky
- Blondel (1983) two-act musical, libretto Tim Rice
- Britannia Preserv'd (1983) one act, libretto A. N. Wilson
- The Ring (1984) one act, after Coronation Street
- Beauty and the Beast (1984) two acts, after Madame Le Prince de Beaumont
- The Exposition of a Picture (1986) 35 minutes
- Waiting (1987) one act
- Mario And The Magician (1988) one act, after Thomas Mann
- Timon of Athens (1990) two acts, after Shakespeare
- Commuting, a wordless opera premiered 1996
