= Driveway Software =

- Company type: Private
- Industry: Telematics
- Founded: 2013; 13 years ago
- Founders: Igor Katsman & Jake Diner
- Headquarters: San Mateo, California, United States
- Key people: Michael S Simmons (CEO); Igor Katsman(CTO, Founder)
- Products: Vehicle tracking software, big data
- Website: www.driveway.ai

Driveway Software is a telematics company that provides a smartphone-based platform for the usage-based insurance (UBI) industry. The company was co-founded in 2013 by CEO Igor Katsman and Jake Diner. It is headquartered in San Mateo, California.

== History ==
The company was founded in 2013. The Driveway app was the first telematics solution in the auto insurance industry to offer automatic trip detection, to function with no hardware dependency, and to bear no significant impact on the performance or battery life of user smartphones.

Within the first six years after its introduction, the app had been downloaded by over 200,000 drivers and had collected more than 500 million miles of driving data.

With its first round of funding in 2015, the company established a customer base of mid-sized insurers.

== Industry involvement ==
The Driveway Software has been featured in industry publications including Insurance Innovation Reporter, IoT Evolution, Property Casualty 360, Insurance Technology Association (ITA), Insurance & Technology and Insurance Thought Leadership when dealing with the importance of UBI, the differences between OBD- and mobile-deployed telematics solutions, real-time data, user privacy, telematics fraud detection and the ways in which UBI can improve customer retention.

In 2015, Driveway Software partnered with the insurance analytics firm Pinnacle Actuarial Resources to offer a coordinated UBI solution based on driver scoring.
