= IIES =

IIES may refer to:

- Insurance Information and Enforcement System
- Institute for International Economic Studies
