= Civil Auto Liability =

Civil Auto Liability (Romanian: Răspundere Civilă Auto) is a Romanian motor-vehicle liability insurance policy that covers damages caused to third parties. This insurance is legally mandatory for any motor vehicle owner in Romania. The insurance policy Romanian: Răspundere Civilă Auto it is also known as RCA. In case of an accident this insurance policy covers repair costs incurred by the party determined to not be at fault.

== Regulation ==
Governed by Ordinance CSA no. 11/2007, RCA insurance is issued as a certificate confirming payment and coverage period rather than a traditional contract. The policy is mandatory and must include a vignette and international insurance document (Green Card). Effective from January 1, 2008, the vignette must be displayed on the upper right corner of the windshield. RCA policies are valid for six or twelve months and also for vehicles with temporary registration plates.

== Coverage ==
The insurance coverage includes a maximum compensation limit for material damages of up to €150,000 in 2008 and €300,000 in 2009, and up to €750,000 for bodily injuries and deaths in 2008 and €1,500,000 in 2009. Coverage starts 48 hours after payment, with exceptions for newly purchased vehicles or policy renewals. Since 2007, premiums are also applicable for trailers and semi-trailers.
