= Family purpose doctrine =

U.S. legal principle

The family purpose doctrine is "a court-created legal fiction that employs agency principles to impose vicarious liability on a head of the household for the negligent operation of a motor vehicle by a family member." In a typical case involving the doctrine, the so-called "head of the household" has given their family members permission to drive their car "for their general use, pleasure, and convenience," i.e., a "family purpose." Furthermore, plaintiffs in most American courts that follow the doctrine can prove the car was being used for a family purpose "merely by showing that it was being used by a family member with the defendant's consent." The underlying theory of the doctrine is that "the driver of a family car, in pursuit of recreation or pleasure, is engaged in the owner's business and is viewed as either the agent or servant of the owner." In some instances, the doctrine may apply to more than just traditional cars, such as motorbikes, trucks, and motor boats. Moreover, a plaintiff's family purpose doctrine claim does not necessarily fail if "the defendant has provided a separate vehicle for each licensed driver in the family, so that each family member ordinarily operates his or her own vehicle."

== Overview ==
In the US, this is primarily a state-level rule with considerable variation in its application. For example, in Arizona, the family purpose doctrine is applied very broadly and holds parents liable even for the negligence of a child driving a motor vehicle in defiance of driving restrictions placed upon him. In Georgia, the 'family purpose' liability extends to third parties allowed by the teenage driver to operate the car. Georgia also extends the rule to adult children in some cases and explicitly extends the rule to family boats.

In Colorado, on the other hand, the same term is used to describe joint and several liability for household bills.

=== History ===
Around the 1910s, when automobiles became affordable for most Americans, significant social and economic changes followed. Specifically, courts across the United States faced new legal issues regarding car accidents. In particular, policy issues from the "parade of litigants seeking to recover damages arising in such accidents brought about some modifications of the standard theories of liability in order to dovetail with the exigencies of the automotive revolution." One of the "modifications" included the family purpose doctrine.

=== Who can sue and who can be sued under the family purpose doctrine ===
For plaintiffs, states that recognize the family purpose doctrine allow "any person suffering injury or loss as a consequence of the negligent operation of a motor vehicle used by a family member..." to sue "the family member who furnished the vehicle."

Categories of potential family purpose doctrine defendants include "the head of a family, the owner of a vehicle, the member of a family who furnished a vehicle to another member of the family, or the member of a family who controlled other family members' use of a vehicle." In most cases, "liability will be based upon actual ownership of a motor vehicle since, in most cases, it is the owner who makes the vehicle available for use by other members of the family." However, the plaintiff does not necessarily have to prove exclusive ownership. "For example, even though a husband and wife purchase a vehicle using joint funds and register the vehicle in both of their names as co-owners, one spouse may be considered to have "furnished" the vehicle to the other spouse." Furthermore, in the case of someone who transferred title to a car to a different family member, the latter could be held liable under the family purpose doctrine "if the transfer is anything less than a sale for full and fair consideration." Defendants using a vehicle that a corporation has title in (rather than the individual) for a family purpose can additionally be held liable. In such a case, while a defendant, as the car's original owner, could possibly "avoid liability by transferring all incidents of ownership of a vehicle to a family business, the defendant will remain liable under the family purpose doctrine where, at the time of the accident in which the plaintiff is injured, the defendant retains some degree of personal control over the vehicle's use."

In some states, statutory law determines the people for which the family purpose doctrine applies. These states have a similar law to Nevada, which provides that the car owner is liable for negligent driving "by the owner's wife, husband, son, daughter, father, mother, brother, sister, or other immediate member of family if operation is with owner's express or implied permission."

=== Which courts have power to handle family purpose doctrine cases ===
When someone sues another person via the family purpose doctrine, the respective state court normally has the power to oversee the case. However, federal district courts may handle family purpose doctrine cases "if the requirements for diversity jurisdiction are satisfied."

=== State courts that expressly reject the doctrine vs. statutory law ===
Alabama, Arkansas, Delaware, Idaho, Illinois, Indiana, Iowa, Kansas, Louisiana, Maine, Maryland, Massachusetts, Montana, New Hampshire, New York, Ohio, Pennsylvania, Texas, and Utah courts have all "expressly rejected" the family purpose doctrine. Regardless, many of these states enacted statutes "which in effect hold the owner responsible for all injuries negligently inflicted while his or her motor vehicle is being used by another with the owner's consent, express or implied, including members of the owner's family."

=== Elements and standard of proof ===
In general, to successfully sue someone under the family purpose doctrine, the plaintiff has to prove four things happened: "

1. the vehicle whose negligent operation resulted in injury to the plaintiff was owned, furnished, or controlled by the defendant;
2. the vehicle was made available to the defendant's family for general use by family members;
3. the vehicle was being used by a family member at the time of the plaintiff's injury;
4. use of the vehicle was with the defendant's permission or acquiescence."

The doctrine requires the plaintiff to prove "both the negligence of the driver of the vehicle and the elements supporting application of the family purpose doctrine." In a situation where a non-family member is the negligent driver of the vehicle "furnished" for a family purpose, the plaintiff has to prove that "a family member had constructive control over the use or operation of the vehicle." The plaintiff may also have to "establish that the defendant is the head of the household." Finally, a car for "business use" rather than a family purpose will not apply to family purpose doctrine claims.

==== Furnishing a motor vehicle ====
The following factors are frequently applied to determine the family member who has ownership of a vehicle: (1) the identity of the person who paid for the vehicle, (2) the identity of the person who had the right to control the vehicle's use, (3) the intent of the parties who bought and sold the vehicle, (4) the intent of the family members as to who, between them, is the owner of the vehicle, (5) the identity of the person to whom the seller made delivery of the vehicle, (6) the identity of the person who exercised property rights in the vehicle from the date of its purchase to the date of the accident, and (7) any other evidence that bears on the issue of who is the owner in fact.

When someone "purchases," "owns," "keeps," "maintains," or "provides" a car for their family members to use, a majority of courts view this as "furnishing" that car. However, "a person must intend to provide the vehicle for another, must take steps to do so, and must contribute substantially toward that end without expectation of reimbursement or compensation" to be a "furnisher."

Some family purpose doctrine cases, such as Brown v. Stogsdill, have involved cars with transferred titles as furnished automobiles. The court in Brown v. Stogsdill concluded that "even though the son had title to the automobile, the defendant might be said to have 'furnished' the automobile if the defendant, through a substantial gift or a loan, had made it possible for the son to purchase the vehicle, which he otherwise would not have been able to do."

==== Permission or acquiescence ====
Most American courts that accept the family purpose doctrine liberally define what counts as "permission." The plaintiff does not have to prove that the driver causing their injuries "had permission to use the vehicle at the exact time and place of the accident, since it will suffice that the person had ongoing permission to use the vehicle." Conversely, once the household family member who controls the car gives the driver permission to use it for a family purpose, that permission may last even if "the family member was using the vehicle at a time or place contrary to the owner's instructions."

The plaintiff may have to show that the family member who was using the vehicle received express permission to do so if the owner made the vehicle available to family members only with express permission. However, the fact that the owner required family members to have special or express permission to use the vehicle does not, in and of itself, render the family purpose doctrine inapplicable, since the doctrine is generally deemed to apply in such circumstances, as well as where the owner provided a vehicle for family members to use at will. The question of whether implied consent has been given, as required for application of family purpose doctrine, is generally determined by the parents' initial decision to furnish a vehicle that will be used for the pleasure and convenience of family members, as opposed to whether the driver was acting in the course and scope of "family business," as would be the case in a true agency relationship, and thus, whether the vehicle is being operated for the direct benefit of only one family member or whether specific limitations are placed on the driver's use of the vehicle is largely irrelevant.

=== Defenses ===
A person who faces a family purpose doctrine lawsuit can protect themselves in court with several different defenses. Generally, "there will be no liability under the family purpose doctrine if:

1. the defendant did not own, furnish, or control use of the vehicle.
2. the defendant owned the vehicle for a business or other nonfamily purpose.
3. the operator of the vehicle was not a member of the defendant's immediate family or household.
4. the operator of the vehicle used it without the defendant's consent or in a manner entirely different from the manner for which consent was given.
5. the operator of the vehicle was not negligent or otherwise was not liable to the plaintiff for some reason other than a defense personal to the operator."

In addition, a key exception to the doctrine is that "title to the vehicle or an insurance policy covering the vehicle, may not be a sufficient basis for invoking the family purpose doctrine where the reality is that the defendant is merely the nominal owner, or owner-of-convenience, and the actual owner and user of the vehicle is some other family member." The defendants in both Calhoun v. Eaves and Dupree v. Batts escaped liability by proving that "although they were the nominal owners, the vehicles were in fact owned and operated solely by an emancipated or adult child living away from home."

=== Damages available to successful plaintiffs ===
With respect to recovery, a plaintiff who successfully sues a defendant under the family purpose doctrine "is entitled to recover compensatory damages." Furthermore, punitive damages are never awarded for these types of suits.
