= Usage-based insurance =

Type of vehicle insurance

Usage-based insurance (UBI), also known as pay as you drive (PAYD), pay how you drive (PHYD) and mile-based auto insurance, is a type of vehicle insurance whereby the costs are dependent upon type of vehicle used, measured against time, distance, behavior (Driver scoring) and place.

This differs from traditional insurance, which attempts to differentiate and reward "safe" drivers, giving them lower premiums and/or a no-claims bonus. However, conventional differentiation is a reflection of history rather than present patterns of behaviour. This means that it may take a long time before safer (or more reckless) patterns of driving and changes in lifestyle feed through into premiums.

== Concept ==
The simplest form of usage-based insurance bases the insurance costs simply on distance driven. However, the general concept of pay as you drive includes any scheme where the insurance costs may depend not just on how much you drive but how, where, and when one drives.

Pay as you drive (PAYD) means that the insurance premium is calculated dynamically, typically according to the amount driven. There are three types of usage-based insurance:

1. Coverage is based on the odometer reading of the vehicle.
2. Coverage is based on mileage aggregated from GPS data, or the number of minutes the vehicle is being used as recorded by a vehicle-independent module transmitting data via cellphone or RF technology.
3. Coverage is based on other data collected from the vehicle, including speed and time-of-day information, historic riskiness of the road, driving actions in addition to distance or time travelled.

The formula can be a simple function of the number of miles driven, or can vary according to the type of driving or the identity of the driver. Once the basic scheme is in place, it is possible to add further details, such as an extra risk premium if someone drives too long without a break, uses their mobile phone while driving, or travels at an excessive speed.

Telematic usage-based insurance (i.e. the latter two types, in which vehicle information is automatically transmitted to the system) provides a much more immediate feedback loop to the driver, by changing the cost of insurance dynamically with a change of risk. This means drivers have a stronger incentive to adopt safer practices. For example, if a commuter switches to public transport or to working at home, this immediately reduces the risk of rush hour accidents. With usage-based insurance, this reduction would be immediately reflected in the cost of car insurance for that month.

The smartphone as measurement probe for insurance telematics has been surveyed

Another form of usage-based insurance is PHYD (Pay How You Drive). Similar to PAYD, but also brings in additional sensors like accelerometer to monitor driving behavior.

== Potential benefits ==
- Social and environmental benefits from more responsible and less unnecessary driving.
- Commercial benefits to the insurance company from better alignment of insurance with actual risk. Improved customer segmentation.
- Potential cost-savings for responsible customers.Potential
- Technology that powers UBI/PAYD enables other vehicle-to-infrastructure solutions including drive-through payments, emergency road assistance, etc.
- More choice for consumers on type of car insurance available to buy.
- Social benefits from accessibility to affordable insurance for young drivers - rather than paying for irresponsible peers, with this type of insurance young drivers pay for how they drive.
- Higher-risk drivers pay most per use, thus have highest incentive to change driving patterns or get off the roads, leaving roads more safe.
- For telematic usage-based insurance: Continuous tracking of vehicle location enhances both personal security and vehicle security. The GPS technology could be used to trace the vehicle whereabouts following an accident, breakdown or theft.could
- The same GPS technology can often be used to provide other (non insurance) benefits to consumers, e.g. satellite navigation.
- Gamification of the data encourages good driver behavior by comparison with other drivers.

== Potential drawbacks ==
- There are limits to the ability of any insurance system to predict future risk, including usage-based insurance. Some lower-risk drivers will still subsidize some higher-risk drivers, to some extent.
- For usage pricing, driving habits must be documented, raising privacy concerns especially in the case of systems which use continuous GPS tracking of vehicles. Personal information such as where you drive may also be inferred using only data such as speed and distance driven.
- Pricing plans based on behavior may be harder to compare between insurance companies, making it more difficult for consumers to price shop and reducing competition.

== Patents ==
There are several issued patents and pending patent applications that have been filed worldwide on various inventions related to telematic auto insurance. These include:

- EP 0700009 "Individual evaluation system for motorcar risk"
- US 5797134 "Motor vehicle monitoring system for determining a cost of insurance" Progressive auto insurance
- EP 2803046 "Reporting of meter indication " Movelo
- EP 2812871A1 "Determination of activity rate of portable electronic equipment" Movelo
- JP application 2002259708 "Vehicular Insurance Bill Calculating System, On-Vehicle Device, and Server Device", Toyota
- WO application 2005083605 "Insurance Fee Calculation Device, Insurance Fee Calculation Program, Insurance Fee Calculation Method, and Insurance Fee Calculation System", AIOI Insurance Company.

In order to make sure that patents did not hinder its Pay as You Drive development program, Norwich Union purchased the UK version of EP0700009 and obtained an exclusive license to any EU patents that may emerge from Progressive's EU patent applications.

In June 2010, Progressive Auto Insurance filed a patent infringement lawsuit against Liberty Mutual over one of Progressive's Pay As You Drive auto insurance patents.

In September 2010 Progressive Auto Insurance filed a declaratory judgment lawsuit against Hughes Telematics to have several its patents covering OBDII mounted wireless data loggers declared invalid. Progressive uses these devices from a competitive supplier, Xirgo Technologies.

== Impaired driving ==
Telematics (including Video telematics with a Dashcam) have been proposed or utilised in order to detect distracted driving. The use of telematics to detect drunk driving and Texting while driving has been proposed. A US patent application combining this technology with a usage based insurance product was open for public comment on peer to patent.
