= Insurance Information and Enforcement System =

The Insurance Information and Enforcement System is a system used, in the United States, by many Department of Motor Vehicles agencies to track people who might be driving without automobile insurance. Since many jurisdictions forbid uninsured driving, a system like this is necessary to keep track of any applications and cancellations of policies. The system was created largely because many people try to trick the DMV into thinking they're keeping their car insured by registering a car with a policy and then cancelling the policy soon after to keep the plates. They usually do this to save money or because they are misinformed about laws, benefits and prices of coverage. Most jurisdictions keep their insurance data open and available to public through online platform.

== See also ==
- Vehicle insurance
