= Visqueen =

Brand of polyethylene plastic sheeting

Visqueen is a brand of polyethylene plastic sheeting (typically low-density polyethylene) produced by British Polythene Industries Limited. It is the registered trade mark of British Polythene Limited in numerous countries throughout the world. It is commonly between 4 and 10 mils (0.004 to 0.01 in./0.1 to 0.25 mm) thick and is available in clear, opaque, blue, and black.

Visqueen is used for many purposes. It is commonly used as a temporary tarpaulin, as a drop cloth when painting, to cover concrete as it sets, to line decorative ponds, and to cover the ground before applying stone or wood chips to prevent weed growth. Large (100 × 20 ft) sheets of Visqueen are used during floods to protect levees from wave wash erosion. It is often suggested for use in greenhouses. Visqueen is used as a condensation barrier inside walls when installing HVAC systems. It is also used as a ground cover in the crawl space of home foundations as a vapor barrier. The use of Visqueen underneath a basement is to prevent water infiltration from water present in the ground that would pass through the concrete or dirt floor and bring in unwanted dampness.

== History ==
Visqueen was first produced circa 1950 by the Visking Corporation, a company founded in the 1920s by Erwin O. Freund for the purpose of making casings for meat products. Visking investigated the post-World War II emerging technology of polyethylene, and developed manufacturing techniques to make pure virgin polyethylene film. Originally spelled VisQueen, the film was an excellent moisture barrier and was marketed to many industrial, architectural, and consumer applications, such as moisture barriers, plant seedbed protection films, building fumigation barriers, drop cloths, case liners, and tarpaulins.

At a time when Visking was the largest producer of polyethylene film in the U.S., Union Carbide acquired Visking in 1956. An antitrust ruling forced the sale of the polyethylene business of Visking to Ethyl Corporation in 1963. Ethyl, known best for its tetra ethyl lead gasoline additive, renamed the division VisQueen. In 1989, Ethyl Corporation, desiring to concentrate on chemical manufacture, spun off VisQueen as a new company, Tredegar Film Products Corporation.

== In popular culture ==
The song "Macho City" by the Steve Miller Band (1981) contains the lyric: "Politicians and lawyers/all know what it means/They'll be keeping it all legal/with political Visqueen".
