= Gerd Schenkel =

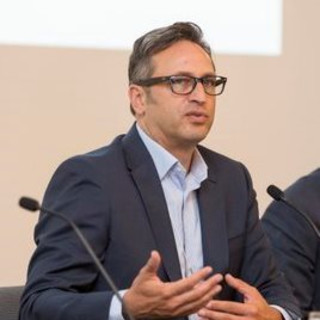
- Gerd Schenkel in 2016
- Born: 1969 (age 56–57); Germany
- Occupation: Business executive
- Known for: Former founder and Executive Director of Telstra Digital, and founder of UBank
- Children: 2
- Website: www.gerdschenkel.com

Gerd Schenkel is a German born Australian business executive. He is the founder of UBank, a Non-Executive Director of Monash IVF Group, a Management Consultant with BGAD Consulting, former Chair of Credit Clear (ASX.CCR), a former non-executive Director of Helia (ASX.HLI), and Senior Adviser at Kearney, a global consultancy.

== Education ==
Schenkel has a master's degree in Engineering and an MBA from the Columbia Business School in New York. He is the co-author of several scientific articles in the field of robotics.

== Career ==
In 2008, Schenkel launched UBank, the direct bank of National Australia Bank which has grown its balance sheet to approximately $20b. Before launching UBank, Schenkel was general manager of NAB's CRM system. Prior to that, Schenkel worked for The Boston Consulting Group.

Until June 2017, he was the CEO of Tyro Payments, an Australian EFTPOS services company, aiming to "disrupt" the incumbent banks. In December 2019, Tyro Payments listed on the Australian Stock Exchange. As of 15 July 2020, the company's market capitalisation was approximately A$1.85b

On 13 June 2017 Tyro announced that Gerd Schenkel had resigned because he wanted to "pursue other business opportunities and spend more time with his family". The Australian Financial Review reported that Schenkel was pursuing "a new banking venture”. Schenkel is the Managing Director of consultancy "BGA Digital".

Prior to Tyro, Gerd Schenkel was the founder and Executive Director of Telstra Digital, the digital division of one of Australia's largest corporations. At Telstra, he led the launch of Belong, Telstra's low cost broadband business which as of June 2017 had over 150,000 customers.

A regular contributor to the Australian business community, in November 2017 was appointed to the Federal Treasurer's Small Business Digitisation Taskforce, which led to the federal Government to provide $37.3 million (over four years from 2018) to support small business' adoption of digital tools and methods.

In December 2018, Gerd was appointed chairman of Australian FinTech Credit Clear.

In October 2020, Credit Clear listed on the Australian Stock Exchange via an initial public offering under the ticker symbol CCR.

In December 2021, Schenkel was appointed to the Board of Helia (formerly Genworth), an ASX listed insurer.

In 2021, Credit Clear announced that it acquired ARMA, a debt collections services business to grow its revenue at a cost of $45m.

In 2021, Schenkel was reported to be part of a "consortium" wanting to acquire ME Bank, but ME Bank was ultimately acquired by Bank of Queensland.

Since 2010, Schenkel has been providing independent consulting services to global organisations.

In 2026, he joined the Board of Monash IVF Group

== Personal ==
Gerd was married and has two daughters, Faedra and Lillie.
