= European Centre for Ecotoxicology and Toxicology of Chemicals =

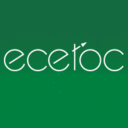
European Centre for Ecotoxicology and Toxicology of Chemicals. Established in 1978. Based in Brussels, Belgium.

The European Centre for Ecotoxicology and Toxicology of Chemicals (ECETOC) is a scientific, non-profit, non-commercial and non-governmental association. Established in 1978, ECETOC's main objective is to identify, evaluate, and through such knowledge, help industry to minimise any potentially adverse effects on human health and the environment that may arise from the manufacture and use of chemicals, biomaterials and pharmaceuticals. Counting as its members the leading companies in the manufacture and use of chemicals, ECETOC facilitates the networking of suitably qualified scientists from its member companies and academia and co-operates in a scientific context with international agencies, governmental authorities and professional societies.

== Organisation ==
ECETOC is governed by a Board of Administration which is responsible for the overall policy and finance of the organisation and appoints the members of its Scientific Committee which defines, manages and peer reviews the ECETOC work programme. The outputs of its work programme are manifested as published reports, papers and specialised workshops.

In recent years, ECETOC has played a key role in advising regulators during the introduction of European regulations on the production and use of chemical substances, see Registration, Evaluation, Authorisation and Restriction of Chemicals (REACH).

Of particular note are the Targeted Risk Assessment Tools developed by ECETOC which use a tiered (step by step) approach for calculating the exposure to and risks from chemicals that might reasonably be expected in defined circumstances of use. The approach addresses exposure to consumers, workers and the environment. The changes in the current (Oct 2014) version 3.1 of the TRA Tool were developed in cooperation with ECHA and are now found within version 2.3 of Chesar.

== 2023 member companies ==
Afton Chemical Corporation	Albemarle	Arkema	BASF	Bayer
Cepsa	Clariant	Corteva	Dow Chemical	DSM
DuPont	Equinor	Evonik Industries	ExxonMobil	Roche
Firmenich	Givaudan	Henkel	Honeywell	Huntsman
L'Oréal	Lubrizol	LyondellBasell	Merck	MSD
NiPera	Procter & Gamble	RifCon	SC Johnson	Shell Chemicals
Solvay	Sumitomo Chemical	Syngenta	Total	Unilever
Wacker

== Activities ==
=== Task forces ===
Established by ECETOC's Scientific Committee in response to an identified need or objective, the work of an ECETOC task force follows terms of reference established by the Scientific Committee. Each task force is supported by a scientific officer from the ECETOC Secretariat and directed by a chairman, who is responsible for assuring the completion of its objectives as set out in the terms of reference established by the Scientific Committee.

=== Workshops ===
ECETOC organised workshops aim to define the 'state of the science' on a given topic or issue. The workshops bring together leading experts to debate the issue(s), then make conclusions and recommendations. By publishing the outcome in a summary document or report, ECETOC can broadly communicate the defined science gaps related to the issue and catalyse active research programmes which address safety, human health and environmental concerns that have been raised.

=== Supporting the Cefic Long-range Research Initiative (LRI) ===
Cefic LRI Projects under ECETOC Management Since the establishment of the Cefic Long-range Research Initiative (LRI) programme in 1998, ECETOC has been a partner organisation with 3 Key Leadership Roles:

Project Proposals These proposals are based on the ability of ECETOC to have multi-stakeholder (industry, regulatory bodies and academia) dialogue and consultation.

Project Selection When proposals are received by LRI to address specific projects, ECETOC organises selection teams and, by following a transparent and impartial process, identifies the proposal considered to be the most worthy for receiving LRI funding.

Project Management An ECETOC Monitoring Team follows the progress of each LRI project providing help and guidance to the researchers as requested.

=== Accredited stakeholder ===
ECETOC has been engaging as an accredited stakeholder to the European Chemicals Agency and others. ECETOC has also provided a number of tools such as the targeted risk assessment tool.

== Publications ==
The main output of ECETOC's work programme is published in a range of reports that are peer-reviewed by its Scientific Committee, comprising industry and academic experts.
