= Government-backed loan =

Loans subsidized by governments

A government-backed loan is a loan subsidized by the government, also known in the United States as a Federal Direct Loan, which protects lenders against defaults on payments, thus making it a lot easier for lenders to offer potential borrowers lower interest rates. Its primary aim is to make home ownership affordable to lower income households and first-time buyers.

== United States ==
There are numerous types of government-backed loans, which vary dependent on the country and status of the borrower. Arguably, the most widely known type of government-backed loan is the US Federal Housing Administration FHA loan, in existence since 1934.

Other types of government-backed loans include the following:

- American Dream Downpayment Initiative - ADDI
- Good Neighbor Next Door
- HOPE VI
- Teacher Next Door Program
- VA loan
- State of New York Mortgage Agency – SONYMA

== See also ==
- FHA insured loan
