= Payment protection insurance =

Covers loan repayments if borrower cannot pay due to illness, unemployment, or death

Payment protection insurance (PPI), also known as credit insurance, credit protection insurance, or loan repayment insurance, is an insurance product that enables consumers to ensure repayment of credit if the borrower dies, becomes ill, disabled, loses a job, or faces other circumstances that may prevent them from earning income to service the debt. It is not to be confused with income protection insurance, which is not specific to a debt but covers any income. PPI was widely sold by banks and other credit providers as an add-on to the loan or overdraft product.

PPI usually covers payments for a finite period, typically 12 months, in which case they might be marketed as short-term income protection insurance (STIP) policies. For loans or mortgages the benefit amount may be the entire monthly payment, but for credit cards it is typically the minimum monthly payment. After the end of the period the borrower must find other means to repay the debt, although some policies repay the debt in full if they are unable to return to work or are diagnosed with a critical illness. The period covered by insurance is typically long enough for most people to start working again and earn enough to service their debt. Careful assessment of what would happen if a person became unemployed would need to be considered, as payments in lieu of notice (for example) may render a claim ineligible despite the insured person being genuinely unemployed. In this case, the approach taken by PPI insurers is consistent with that taken by the Benefits Agency in respect of unemployment benefits.

Most PPI policies are not sought out by consumers. In some cases, consumers claim to be unaware that they even have the insurance. In sales connected to loans, products were often promoted by commission-based telesales departments. Fear of losing the loan was exploited, as the product was effectively cited as an element of underwriting. Any attention to suitability was likely to be minimal, if it existed at all.

In all types of insurance some claims are accepted and some are rejected. Notably, in the case of PPI, the number of rejected claims is high compared to other types of insurance. The rare customers who deliberately seek out the policy may have little recourse when they discover it is of no benefit.

== History ==
=== UK 2010s mis-selling scandal ===
In the United Kingdom, according to the UK Government, PPI was mis-sold and complaints about it were mishandled on an industrial scale for well over a decade, with this mis-selling being carried out by not only the banks or providers, but also by third-party brokers.

The sale of such policies was typically encouraged by large commissions, as the insurance would commonly make the bank/provider more money than the interest on the original loan, such that many mainstream personal loan providers made little or no profit on the loans themselves; all or almost all profit was derived from PPI commission and profit share. Certain companies developed sales scripts which guided salespeople to say only that the loan was "protected" without mentioning the nature or cost of the insurance. When challenged by the customer, they sometimes incorrectly stated that this insurance improved the borrower's chances of getting the loan or that it was mandatory.

=== Fines and compensation ===
Several high-profile companies were fined by the Financial Conduct Authority for the widespread mis-selling of PPI. The FCA fined Clydesdale Bank £20,678,300 for serious failings in its PPI complaint handling processes between May 2011 and July 2013. This is the largest ever fine imposed by the FCA for failings relating to PPI. Clydesdale agreed to settle at an early stage of the FCA's investigation and therefore qualified for a 30% stage 1 discount. Were it not for this, the FCA would have imposed a financial penalty of £29,540,500. Alliance and Leicester were fined £7 million for their part in the mis-selling controversy, and several others including Capital One, HSBC Finance and Egg were fined up to £1.1 million. Claims against mis-sold PPI slowly increased, and approached the levels seen during the 2006–07 period, when thousands of bank customers made claims relating to allegedly unfair bank charges. In their 2009/2010 annual report, the Financial Ombudsman Service stated that 30% of new cases referred to payment protection insurance. A customer who purchases a PPI policy may initiate a claim for mis-sold PPI by complaining to the bank, lender, or broker who sold the policy.

On 6 April 2011 the Competition Commission released their investigation order intended to prevent mis-selling in the future. Key rules in the order, designed to enable the customer to shop around and make an informed decision, include: provision of adequate information when selling payment protection and providing a personal quote; obligation to provide an annual review; and prohibition of selling payment protection at the same time the credit agreement is entered into. Most rules came into force in October 2011, with some following in April 2012.

The Central Bank of Ireland in April 2014 was described as having "arbitrarily excluded the majority of consumers" from getting compensation for mis-sold PPI, by setting a cutoff date of 2007 when it introduced its Consumer Protection Code. UK banks provided over £22 billion for PPI misselling costs – which, if scaled on a pro-rata basis, is many multiples of the compensation the Irish banks were asked to repay. The offending banks were also not fined which was in sharp contrast to the regime imposed on UK banks. Lawyers were appalled at the "reckless" advice the Irish Central Bank gave consumers who were missold PPI policies, which "will play into the hands of the financial institution."

UK banks set up multibillion-pound provisions by 2012 to compensate customers who were mis-sold PPI; Lloyds Banking Group set aside £3.6 billion, HSBC have provisions of £745 million, and RBS estimated they would compensate £5.3 billion. By 2016 this number had risen to £40 billion. By this time PPI had become the most complained about financial product.

=== Legal claims ===
Payment protection insurance can be useful; however, many policies were mis-sold alongside loans, credit cards and mortgages. PPI mis-selling left the borrower with a policy of no use to them if they needed to make a claim. Reclaiming PPI payments and statutory interest charges on these payments is possible either by the policyholder or via a lawyer or claims management company.

The first ever PPI case was in 1992–1993 (Bristol, 93/10771). It was judged that the total payments of the insurance premium were almost as high as the total benefit that could be claimed. A 10-year non disclosure clause was put in place as part of the settlement. After 10 years, a copy of the judgement was sent to the Office of Fair Trading and Citizens Advice Bureau. Soon after, a super complaint was raised.

The judicial review that followed hit the headlines as it eventually ruled in the favour of the borrowers, enabling a large number of consumers to reclaim PPI payments. To date, £38.3 billion has been repaid to consumers (May 2020).

In 2014, a PPI claim from Susan Plevin against Paragon Personal Finance revealed that over 71% of the PPI sales amount was a commission. This was deemed as a form of mis-selling. The Plevin case caused the banks and the Financial Ombudsman to review even more PPI claims.

== Calculations ==
The price paid for payment protection insurance can vary quite significantly depending on the lender. A survey in 2018 of forty-eight major lenders by Which? Ltd found the price of PPI was 16–25% of the amount of the debt.

PPI premiums may be charged on a monthly basis or the full PPI premium may be added to the loan up-front to cover the cost of the policy. With this latter payment approach, known as a "Single Premium Policy", the money borrowed from the provider to pay for the insurance policy incurs additional interest, typically at the same APR as is being charged for the original sum borrowed, further increasing the effective total cost of the policy to the customer.

Payment protection insurance on credit cards is calculated differently from lump sum loans, as initially there is no sum outstanding and it is unknown if the customer will ever use their card facility. However, in the event that the credit facility is used and the balance is not paid in full each month, a customer will be charged typically between 0.78% and 1% or £0.78 to £1.00 from every £100 which is a balance of their current card balance on a monthly basis, as the premium for the insurance. When interest on the credit card is added to the premium, it can become very expensive. For example, the cost of PPI for the average credit card in the UK charging 19.32% on an average of £5,000 each month adds an extra £3,219.88 in premiums and interest.

With lump sum loans PPI premiums are paid upfront with the cost from 13% to 56% of the loan amount as reported by the Citizens Advice Bureau (CAB) who launched a Super Complaint into what it called the Protection Racket.

PPI premiums as proportion of loan: cases reported
Loan type	Loan amount	PPI premium	Premium % of loan
Unsecured personal loan	£8,993	£2,217	25%
Unsecured personal loan	£11,000	£5,133	47%
Hire purchase for car	£5,059	£2,157	43%
Hire purchase for car	£6,895	£2,317	34%
Unsecured loan	£5,600	£744	13%
Secured loan	£25,000	£12,127	49%
Secured loan	£35,000	£10,150	29%
Conditional sale for car	£4,300	£2,394	56%

When interest is charged on the premiums, the cost of a single premium policy increases the cost geometrically. The above secured loan of £25,000 over a 25-year term at 4.5% interest costs the customer an additional £20,221.74 for PPI. Moneymadeclear calculates the repayment for that loan to be £138.96 a month whereas a stand-alone payment protection policy for say a 30-year-old borrowing the same amount covering the same term would cost the customer £1992 in total, almost one-tenth of the cost of the single premium policy.

== Credit life insurance ==
Credit life insurance is a type of credit insurance or PPI sold by a lender in the United States to pay off an outstanding loan balance if the borrower dies. Once the loan is paid off with the credit life insurance, there would be no claim on the borrower's estate. Credit life insurance is charged upfront, rather than spread over the life of the loan. A common example of a loan that can include credit insurance is an installment loan.

Credit life insurance may either be a permanent life insurance or a term life insurance; or an individual life insurance or a group term life insurance. Creditor would usually offer insurance products provided by its accredited insurers. Borrower would usually choose from among those that is most suitable to the term and amount of loan.

The sale of credit life insurance has been controversial in many cases. For example, consumers are sometimes led to believe credit life insurance is required when added to loan contracts. When a lender sells more credit life insurance than is required to pay off the loan, the cost of the premiums is inflated along with the amount of the loan, which increases the amount of interest charged and the amount the consumer has to repay.

Terms and conditions for loan APR and fees vary from state to state and some are comparatively vague. For states that do not cap interest rates for installment loan balances, there are often unconscionable provisions in place.

For lenders, credit life insurance loss ratios typically reach 44%, meaning 44% of premiums paid on the credit life insurance product are paid back in claims, compared to non-credit insurance product loss ratios of at least 70%. While many states cap interest and loan fees, lenders use products such as credit life insurance to increase profit and the overall cost of loans.

States where the sale of credit insurance is authorized were found to include at least one type of insurance included with loan contracts in 80% of cases. On average, the contracts analyzed included 2.67 insurance and other ancillary products. Consumers who refinance loan can be adversely affected by credit insurance because most of the money that consumers typically pay before refinancing is applied to fees and interest.

The Federal Trade Commission has issued a consumer alert concerning various types of credit insurance, including credit life insurance. The FTC consumer alert includes credit insurance shopping tips for consumers seeking a loan.

Advocates for credit insurance products argue consumers that are not insurable could benefit from a product such as credit life insurance rather than standard life insurance as no medical exam is required in the former scenario. In the 9 states that have community property laws in place, the surviving party could be responsible for the debtholder's repayment without life insurance or credit life insurance in place.

== See also ==
- Lenders mortgage insurance
- Mortgage insurance
