= Skip Loans =

Australian non-bank mortgage lender

Skip Loans (under the name Skip, formerly Sucasa) is an Australian non-bank mortgage lender. It offers residential mortgages which include higher loan-to-value ratio loans, that allow eligible borrowers to purchase property with relatively small deposits. The company operated as Sucasa until February 2026, when it rebranded as Skip.

== History ==
Skip was founded in 2022 by Mario Emmanuel, Marian Emmanuel and Adam Trouncer. In April 2024, while operating under the name Sucasa, it introduced a mortgage which enabled eligible borrowers to buy property with a deposit as small as 2 per cent.

In April 2025, Sucasa appointed Paul Coloe as head of credit and underwriting and David Ewens as head of distribution, and launched a portal for mortgage brokers. By early 2026, broker-originated loans accounted for about three-quarters of its new business.

In January 2026, the Australian Financial Review profiled Sucasa in the context of changes to Australia's low-deposit mortgage market following the expansion of the federal government's 5 per cent deposit scheme.

Sucasa rebranded as Skip the following month.

During 2026, Skip expanded its broker distribution. It integrated its products with the Quickli platform in February, joined the outsource Financial lender panel in March, and moved broker loan lodgement to NextGen's ApplyOnline platform in May.

In June 2026, Connective launched a white-label low-deposit mortgage product with Skip. The following month, Loan Market Group added a Skip white-label product to its lending portfolio.

Mortgage Choice in conjunction with Skip launched Mortgage Choice Skip as the white-label product that was to be available nationwide in September 2026 in the form of owner occupier and investment loans at a ratio of 98 per cent.

== Products ==
Skip offers residential mortgages for borrowers with relatively small deposits. Mortgage Professional Australia describes the lending process used by the company as one where a risk fee is charged instead of lenders mortgage insurance.
