= VA loan =

Type of mortgage loan in the United States

A VA loan is a mortgage loan in the United States guaranteed by the United States Department of Veterans Affairs (VA). The program is for American veterans, military members currently serving in the U.S. military, reservists and select surviving spouses (provided they do not remarry) and can be used to purchase single-family homes, condominiums, multi-unit properties, manufactured homes and new construction. The VA does not originate loans, but sets the rules for who may qualify, issues minimum guidelines and requirements under which mortgages may be offered and financially guarantees loans that qualify under the program.

The basic intention of the VA home loan program is to supply home financing to eligible veterans and to help veterans purchase properties with no down payment. The loan may be issued by qualified lenders.

The VA loan allows veterans 103.6 percent financing without private mortgage insurance (PMI) or a 20 percent second mortgage and up to $6,000 for energy efficient improvements. A VA funding fee of 0 to 3.6% of the loan amount is paid to the VA; this fee may also be financed and some may qualify for an exemption. In a purchase, veterans may borrow up to 103.6% of the sales price or reasonable value of the home, whichever is less. Since there is no monthly PMI, more of the mortgage payment goes directly towards qualifying for the loan amount, allowing for larger loans with the same payment. In a refinance, where a new VA loan is created, veterans may borrow up to 100% of a property's reasonable value, where allowed by state laws. In a refinance where the loan is a VA loan refinancing to VA loan (IRRRL Refinance), the veteran may borrow up to 100.5% of the total loan amount. The additional .5% is the funding fee for a VA Interest Rate Reduction Refinance.

VA loans allow veterans to qualify for loan amounts larger than traditional Fannie Mae / conforming loans. Standard VA guidelines state that the VA will insure a mortgage where the monthly payment of the loan is up to 41% of the gross monthly income vs. 28% for a conforming loan assuming the veteran has no monthly bills, although there is no hard limit to the DTI for a VA home loan. Veterans have been known to be approved with a DTI of up to 80%, if there are other factors that strengthen their loan application. These factors include a low Loan-To-Value (LTV), sufficient residual income, additional income received but not used to qualify for the loan, good credit, etc...

== Common misconceptions ==
Despite the popularity of VA loans, several misconceptions persist among potential borrowers. Some believe the benefit can only be used once, that VA loans take longer to close, or that perfect credit is required. In reality, the benefit is reusable, closing times are often comparable to conventional loans, and credit requirements are more flexible. Other myths include the belief that VA loans limit home choices or are more expensive due to the funding fee; however, VA loans can be used for a variety of property types and often result in lower overall costs.

== History ==
The original Servicemen's Readjustment Act, passed by the United States Congress in 1944, extended a wide variety of benefits to eligible veterans. The VA loan guarantee program was especially important to veterans. Under the law, as amended, the VA is authorized to guarantee or insure home, farm, and business loans made to veterans by lending institutions. As of 2020, over 25 million VA home loans have been insured by the government. The VA can make direct loans in certain areas for the purpose of purchasing or constructing a home or farm residence, or for repair, alteration, or improvement of the dwelling. The terms and requirements of VA farm and business loans have not induced private lenders to make such loans in volume during recent years.

The Veterans Housing Act of 1970 removed all termination dates for applying for VA-guaranteed housing loans. This 1970 amendment also provided for VA-guaranteed loans on mobile homes.

More recently, the Veterans Housing Benefits Improvement Act of 1978 expanded and increased the housing benefits for millions of American veterans.

Until 1992, the VA loan guarantee program was available only to veterans who served on active duty during specified periods. However, with the enactment of the Veterans Home Loan Program Amendments of 1992 (Public Law 102-547, approved 28 October 1992), program eligibility was expanded to include Reservists and National Guard personnel who served honorably for at least six years without otherwise qualifying under the previous active duty provisions. Such personnel are required to pay a slightly higher funding fee when obtaining a VA home loan.

Despite a great deal of confusion and misunderstanding, the federal government generally does not make direct loans under the act. The government simply guarantees loans made by ordinary mortgage lenders (descriptions of which appear in subsequent sections) after veterans make their own arrangements for the loans through normal financial circles. The Veterans Administration then appraises the property in question and, if satisfied with the risk involved, guarantees the lender against loss of principal if the buyer defaults.

In association with the VA's program, the Servicemembers' Civil Relief Act protects service members from financial woes on their home loan that may occur as a result of active duty commitments, freezing their interest rates at 6%.

On October 26, 2012, the Department of Veterans Affairs announced it has guaranteed 20 million home loans since its home loan program was established in 1944 as part of the original GI Bill of Rights for returning World War II Veterans. The 20 millionth loan was guaranteed for a home in Woodbridge, Va., purchased by the surviving spouse of an Iraq War Veteran who died in 2010.

On June 22, 2019, the VA loan program celebrated its 75th anniversary since the passing of the original Servicemen's Readjustment Act, also known as the G.I. Bill. During the celebration, the Department of Veterans Affairs announced the program had guaranteed 24 million VA home loans since its inception.

On June 25, 2019, the Blue Water Navy Vietnam Veterans Act of 2019 was signed into law temporarily increasing the VA funding fee for active duty service members and veterans starting January 1, 2020. The law removed VA county loan limits for homebuyers with full VA loan entitlement and made Purple Heart recipients exempt from paying the VA funding fee. Several members of Congress were displeased after the passing of the act, writing an open letter to House Speaker Nancy Pelosi and Minority Leader Kevin McCarthy asking that future bills not be paid for by increasing VA loan fees.

In June 2023, the House Armed Services Committee approved the Major Richard Star Act which would allow veterans who receive medical retirement before 20 years of service to receive both full military retirement pay and disability pay. The bill has broad bipartisan support but in order to become law, it requires full offsetting for its Congressional Budge Office estimated cost of $9.75 billion over the next ten years.

On November 11, 2023, NPR published an investigation into thousands of veterans who lost income and took a COVID forbearance on their mortgage payments for six or twelve months, who then became at risk of losing their homes when the VA in October 2022 ended the Partial Claim Payment program, an affordable way to start paying their mortgages again. Approximately 6,000 VA loan holders who took COVID forbearances were in the foreclosure process and 34,000 were delinquent. On November 15, US Senators Sherrod Brown, Jon Tester, Jack Reed, and Tim Kaine wrote an open letter to the VA to immediately pause the foreclosure process on all VA loans where borrowers would likely qualify for the VA’s new Veterans Assistance Servicing Purchase (VASP) program. On November 17, the VA subsequently halted VA loan foreclosures for six months.

== Funding fees ==
VA loan recipients pay a funding fee to the VA to offset the cost of their loans requiring no down payment nor mortgage insurance. Veterans may be exempt from paying the funding fee, or receive a refund on funding fees paid, if they meet one of five criteria such as receiving VA disability compensation or receiving a Purple Heart. It is a myth that the disability compensation must be some percentage, "such as minimum of 10%". Title 38 Veterans Benefits states "...38 U.S. Code § 3729.Loan fee (c) - (1) A fee may not be collected under this section from a veteran who is receiving compensation (or who, but for the receipt of retirement pay or active service pay, would be entitled to receive compensation) or from a surviving spouse of any veteran (including a person who died in the active military, naval, or air service) who died from a service-connected disability..." If a veteran is awarded disability compensation after paying a funding fee, he/she can apply for a refund of this funding fee, so long as the beginning date of the disability is prior to the closing date of the home mortgage.

In August 2012, Congress passed a bill that allows a Veteran to receive the benefits of having Veteran Disability while it is still pending. The amount paid for the funding fee can be refunded back to the Veteran when a determination is made and the paperwork is received.

The VA Funding fee may be paid in cash or included in the loan amount. Closing costs such as VA appraisal, credit report, loan processing fee, title search, title insurance, recording fees, transfer taxes, survey charges, or hazard insurance may not be included in the loan. However, the seller may pay these on behalf of the VA borrower.

=== Purchase and construction loans ===
Due to the Blue Water Navy Vietnam Veterans Act of 2019, the VA funding fee is equalized for all branches of service starting January 1, 2020. For active duty military members and veterans, this means an increase in VA funding fee costs for a period of 2 years. If you have a service-connected disability that you are compensated for by the VA or if you are a surviving spouse of veteran who died in service or from service-connected disabilities, the funding fee is waived.

Type of Veteran	Down Payment	First Time Use	Subsequent Use
Regular Military, Reserves/National Guard	None; 5%-9.99% 10% or more	2.3% 1.65% 1.4%	3.6%* 1.65% 1.4%

The VA funding fee can be financed directly into the maximum loan amount for the county in which the home is located. For subsequent use VA loans, if the sales price and the financed VA funding fee total more than maximum loan amount for that county, the borrower or seller must pay for the fee out of pocket. All VA loans require an impound account for property taxes and homeowners insurance which makes the monthly payment of VA loans calculated as a PITI payment.**

=== Cash-out refinancing loans ===
Type of Veterans	Percentage for First Time Use	Percentage for Subsequent Use
Regular Military, Reserves/National Guard	2.3%	3.6%*

- The higher subsequent use fee does not apply to these types of loans if the veteran’s only
  prior use of entitlement was for a manufactured home loan.

=== Other types of loans ===
Type of Loan	Percentage for Either Type of Veteran Whether First Time or Subsequent Use
Interest Rate Reduction; Refinancing Loans	.50%
Manufactured Home Loans	1.00%
Loan Assumptions	.50%

- Veterans who previously lived in a home they had to then rent out will typically qualify for a no appraisal Interest Rate Reduction Refinance. The Veteran's Administration also allows Veteran Homeowners to refinance from a Conventional loan to a VA mortgage Loan. This process, however, does require an appraisal.

== Equivalents of VA loans ==
=== Private mortgage insurance ===
Private mortgage insurance (PMI) guarantees conventional home mortgage loans - those that are not guaranteed by the government. This loan program is a private sector equivalent to the Federal Housing Administration (FHA) and VA loan programs.

The PMI company insures a percentage of the consumer's loan to reduce the lender's risk; this percentage is paid to the lender if the consumer does not pay and the lender forecloses the loan.

Lenders decide if they need and want private mortgage insurance. If they so decide, it becomes a requirement of the loan. PMI companies charge a fee to insure a mortgage loan; the VA insures a loan at no cost to a veteran buyer (other than the VA funding fee); the FHA charges a monthly fee to guarantee the loan.

== VA Loan application ==
The VA loan application is a standardized loan application form 1003 issued by Fannie Mae also known as Freddie Mac Form 65. It is a Federal crime punishable by fine or imprisonment, or both, to knowingly make any false statements on a VA loan application under the provisions of Title 18, United States Code, Section 1001, et seq.

You will need the following paperwork to apply:

- Copies of your W2 statements for the past two years, so your gross household income can be confirmed,
- Copies of your previous two pay stubs,
- Documentation of other assets (checking accounts, savings accounts, financial investments, trust funds, etc.),
- If self-employed, two years of consecutive tax returns will be required.
- The Veteran also needs to supply their DD 214 and Certificate of Eligibility (COE)

== Qualifying for Veteran Home Loans ==
The Veteran Loan program is designed for veterans who meet the minimum number of days of completed service. Some of the other eligibility requirements for the VA loan program and some specific home loan benefits include the length of service or service commitment, duty status and character of service. The program does allow for benefits to Surviving Spouses.

The VA does not have a minimum credit score used for pre-qualifying for a mortgage loan, however, most Lenders require a minimum credit score of at least 620.

A Veteran who has used their entitlement to previously purchase a home, may have entitlement left to purchase another one. If you previously purchased a home using your VA Benefits then you might still have some of that “Entitlement” available to you for the purchase of a new home. To calculate Maximum Entitlement available, consider the following:

1. If your previous home was purchased using a VA Loan, and that loan was paid off by the new owners, the full entitlement may have been restored.
2. If you sold your home to someone, and allowed them to assume your VA Loan, then you might have the full entitlement restored, if one or more of the purchasers were also Veterans.
3. If you still own the home, and you are renting it out – you might be able to purchase a new home using your partial entitlement, but there are several restrictions.

Allowable Income Sources used to qualify for a VA Loan include: Retirement Income, Social Security Income, Child Support, Alimony and Separate Maintenance, BAH, BAS and Disability Income. Dependency and Indemnity Compensation (DIC) for a Surviving Spouse can also be included. In addition, stable, documented income from employers remains the best income source for VA loans.

== Homeless Veterans - The National Center on Homelessness Among Veterans (NCHAV) ==
The National Center on Homelessness Among Veterans (NCHAV) has planned to increase recovery-oriented care provided to homeless Veterans, or those soon to be, through the development and dissemination of evidence-based programs, policies as well as best practices. It was established in 2009 to support the execution of the U.S. Department of Veteran Affairs’ (VA’s) Five Year Plan to End Homelessness Among Veterans. This plan was born out of the goals and timeframes set forth by the legislators, governors, nonprofits, faith-based and community organizations, the U.S. Congress, the United States Interagency Council on Homelessness, business entities and philanthropic leaders to end homelessness in America and progress to make affordable and stable housing available to all its people.

== NCHAV ==
Below are the four core activities of NCHAV’s integrated and organized work:

- Model Development & Implementation
- Research & methodology
- Education & Dissemination
- Policy Analysis
