= NewMarket Corporation =

American chemical company

- Type: Public
- Traded as: NYSE: NEU; S&P 400 Component
- Industry: Chemicals
- Founded: 1887 (as Albemarle Paper Manufacturing Company)
- Headquarters: Richmond, Virginia, U.S.
- Area served: Worldwide
- Key people: Thomas E. Gottwald (Chairman, CEO), William J.Skrobacz (CFO)
- Products: Petroleum Additives
- Revenue: ▲US$2.765 billion (2022)
- Operating income: ▲US$355.139 million (2022)
- Net income: ▲US$279.538 million (2022)
- Total assets: ▼US$2.407 billion (2022)
- Total equity: ▲US$762.407 million (2022)
- Number of employees: 2,104 (2021)
- Website: newmarket.com

NewMarket Corporation (NYSE: NEU), is a publicly traded American company that primarily serves the petroleum additives industry. The company is based in Richmond, Virginia, and has operations in North America, Latin America, Europe, the Middle East and Asia Pacific. The company's predecessor, the Albemarle Paper Manufacturing Company, was founded in 1887.

NewMarket Corporation employs more than 2,100 employees across its global operations, with an annual revenue of more than $2 billion. The primary business of the company and its subsidiaries is the development, manufacturing, blending and global marketing of fuel and oil additives.

== Businesses ==
NewMarket Corporation produces lubricant and fuel additives through two subsidiaries: Afton Chemical Corporation and Ethyl Corporation. Two additional subsidiaries, NewMarket Services Corporation and NewMarket Development Corporation, primarily provide operational support.

Afton Chemical Corporation

Afton Chemical Corporation produces fuel additives and lubricant additives. The company also produces driveline additives and a variety of industrial additives, such as hydraulic lubricants and metalworking fluid components.

Afton Chemical has manufacturing locations throughout the United States, as well as in Belgium, England, India, China, Brazil Mexico and Singapore The company also has regional offices in North America, Latin America, Asia Pacific, Europe, India and the Middle East and a R&D technical center for vehicle-based research in Ashland, Virginia.

Gina Harm is the president of Afton Chemical.

Ethyl Corporation

Ethyl provides contract manufacturing services to Afton and to third parties and is a marketer of tetraethyl lead in North America. The company was founded in 1924 after Charles Kettering and a team of scientists discovered an anti-knocking agent for vehicle engines in 1921. Ethyl Corporation is based in Richmond, Virginia, and has a manufacturing plant in Houston, Texas. John Street is the president of Ethyl Corporation.

NewMarket Services Corporation

NewMarket Services Corporation provides administrative services to NewMarket Corporation and its subsidiaries.

NewMarket Development Corporation

New Market Development Corporation manages the approximately 57-acre property that NewMarket Corporation owns in Richmond, Virginia.

== History ==
NewMarket Corporation was founded in 1887 as the Albemarle Paper Manufacturing Company. In 1964, Albemarle Paper Manufacturing Company acquired Ethyl Corporation, a company started in 1924 by Charles Kettering following the development of Tetraethyllead, an anti-knocking agent for gasoline engines in passenger vehicles.

Ethyl Corporation acquired Edwin Cooper, Inc., a supplier of oil and lubricant additives, in 1975. The acquisitions continued with U.S.-based Amoco Petroleum Additives and Japan-based Nippon Cooper in 1992, and Texaco Additives Company in 1996.

NewMarket Corporation was incorporated in 2004 and renamed its Ethyl Petroleum Additives, Inc. subsidiary as Afton Chemical Corporation. Afton acquired GE Water & Process Technologies’ fuel additives business in 2008 and acquired metalworking additives producer Polartech in 2010.
