= FHA-Secure =

FHA-Secure was an American Federal Housing Administration refinancing program to help borrowers avoid foreclosure. It was similar to other FHA loans. The programme was launched in 2007 and was closed at the end of 2008.

FHA-Secure was a refinancing option that gives homeowners with non-FHA adjustable rate mortgages (ARMs), current or delinquent and regardless of reset status, the ability to refinance into a FHA-insured mortgage. With FHA-Secure, the lender will not automatically disqualify the lender because they were delinquent on their loan, and the lender may offer a second mortgage to make up the difference between the value of your property and what was owed.

== Eligible ==
So long as the borrower was current on their mortgage and had sufficient income to make the mortgage payment, they were eligible for an FHA-Secure refinance. If they were delinquent, the default must have been due to the payment shock of an interest rate reset or, in the case of an Option ARM, the "recasting" of the mortgage was fully amortizing.

By refinancing into a FHA-insured mortgage, borrowers could expect to pay lower monthly mortgage payments. FHA-Secure could improve the quality of life for many communities by helping to reduce the number of mortgage defaults and bringing greater stability to local housing markets.
