= Window well =

Recess in the ground around a window

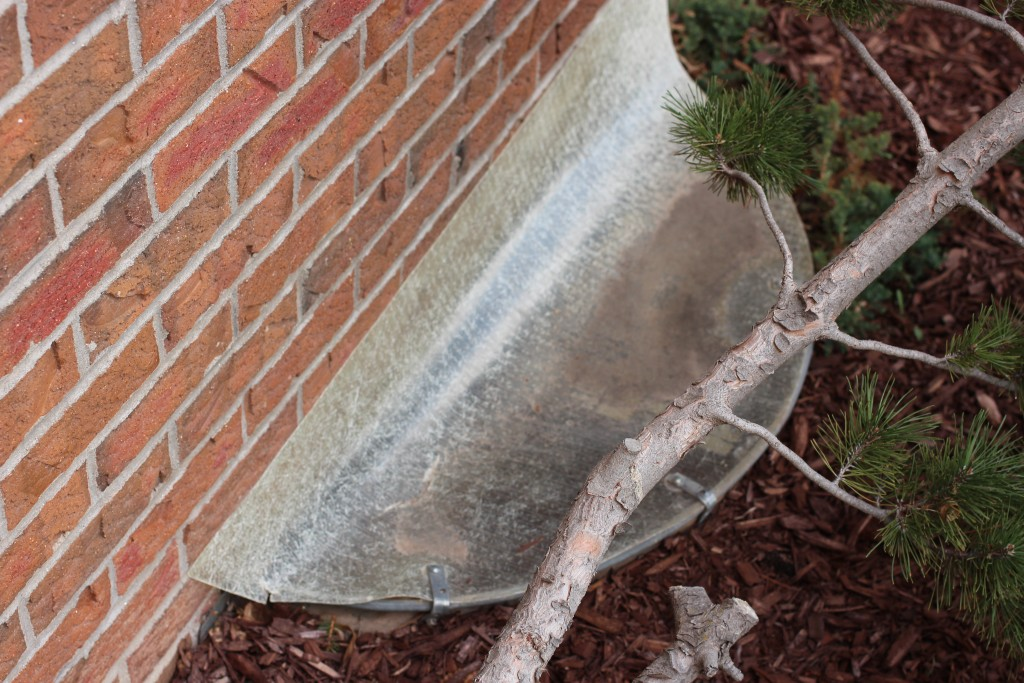
A window well cover made from polycarbonate.

A window well is a recess in the ground around a building to allow for installation of bigger windows in a basement either below ground or partially below ground. By making it possible to put in a larger window, the window acts as an emergency exit in case of fire as well as letting in additional daylight. Such a (basement) window where people can escape through in case of an emergency is called an egress window.

For fire safety reasons, its minimum dimensions are regulated by building code (similar to egress windows in bedrooms and living rooms). There must be a clear space in front of the window, which necessitates the use of window wells. Sometimes they are fitted with covers to keep out snow and debris, as well as to prevent accidental falls. They also require a drain to prevent water from collecting and seeping into the basement, as well as a ladder or steps if the well exceeds a certain depth.

== See also ==
- Alcove (architecture)
- Niche (architecture)
