= Tyro (company) =

Australian public company

- Logo used from 2019
- Formerly: MoneySwitch Limited
- Type: Public
- Traded as: ASX: TYR
- Industry: EFTPOS; Financial services
- Predecessor: MoneySwitch Limited
- Founded: 3 February 2003; 23 years ago
- Founders: Andrew Rothwell; Paul Wood; Peter Haig
- Headquarters: Sydney, Australia
- Area served: Australia
- Key people: Nigel Lee (CEO); David Thodey (Chairman); Emma Burke (CFO); Catherine Harris (NXD)
- Services: EFTPOS; Business banking; Deposit account; Loan; Term deposit; E-commerce
- Revenue: ▲AUD$189,770,000; (2019)
- Operating income: ▲AUD$83,260,000; (2019)
- Net income: ▼AUD$ (18,397,000); (2019)
- Total assets: ▲AUD$148,664,000; (2019)
- Total equity: ▲AUD$93,069,000; (2019)
- Number of employees: 450 (2019)
- Website: tyro.com
- Footnotes "Tyro Annual Report 2019l" (PDF). Tyro Payments.

Tyro Payments Limited (Tyro) is an Australian payments financial institution specialising in merchant credit, debit and EFTPOS acquiring.

== History ==
Tyro Acquiring Volume

Tyro was originally founded as MoneySwitch Ltd by Peter Haig, Andrew Rothwell and Paul Wood in 2003. Tyro was the first new entrant into the Australian EFTPOS business since 1996. It was the second company in Australia to be granted a Specialist Credit Card Institution (SCCI) licence after GE Capital.

In 2012, Tyro exceeded $3.5 billion of card transaction volume.

In 2015, Tyro was granted a "banking licence", becoming an "Authorised Deposit taking Institution (ADI)". It was the first Australian technology company to be granted this licence by the Australian Prudential Regulatory Authority.

In October 2016, Tyro appointed Gerd Schenkel, founder of UBank and Telstra Digital as its new CEO. Gerd resigned in June 2017. In January 2018, Tyro appointed Robbie Cooke as CEO. Cooke was formerly managing director of Tatts Group. In June 2022, Robbie Cooke resigned as CEO. Jonathan (Jon) Davey was appointed as the new CEO on October 3. Jon Davey had led Tyro’s health business unit, following Tyro’s acquisition of health fintech Medipass.

In February 2017, Tyro became the first bank to implement payments via Siri. At the same time, Tyro announced a partnership with Afterpay.

On January 15, 2020, Tyro requested a trading halt on its shares on the same day a short selling firm, Viceroy Research, published a report alleging that a large number of terminals were taken down.

In January 2021, Tyro experienced a terminal connectivity issue that impacted many of its merchants.

In December 2025, it was announced that Tyro had agreed to acquire Melbourne-based financial technology start-up Thriday, an SME financial management platform, for an undisclosed amount. The transaction, subject to customary closing conditions, was expected to complete in January 2026 and marked Tyro’s expansion into integrated business finance and administration software.

== Operations ==
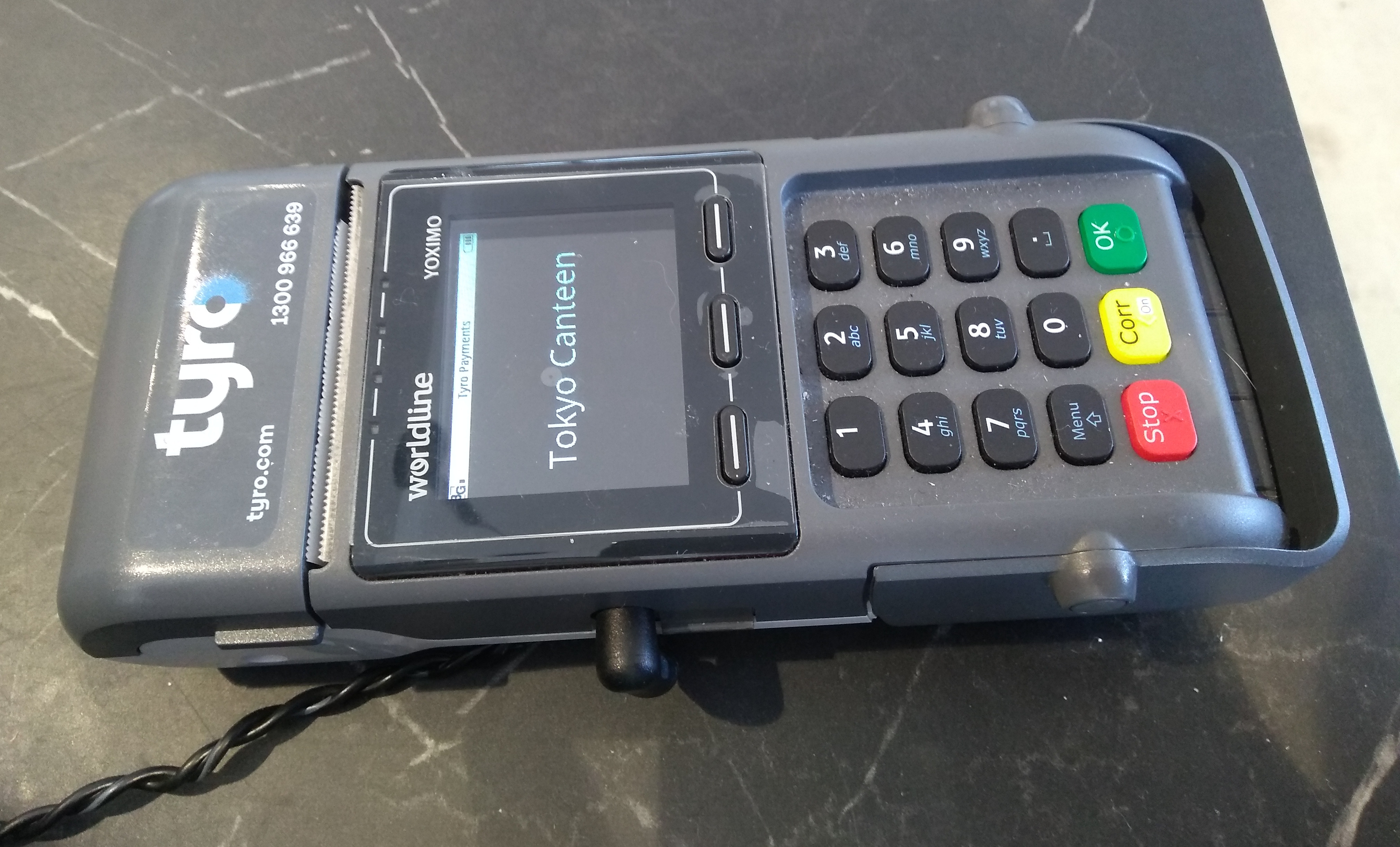
Tyro terminal used in cafe

Tyro self-describes its strategy to compete with the major banks as "nextgen banking" focusing on Small and Medium Enterprises (SMEs).

As part of that, Tyro is lobbying for a more open data exchange in the traditional banking industry.

Typo launched a new embedded payment software solution enabling businesses to accept tap-to-pay payments via any iOS and android device and point-of-sale (POS) systems.

=== Takeover battle ===
In September 2022, Tyro's shares rose 18% after the company received - and rejected - an unsolicited takeover bid from Private Equity company Potentia.

In Dec 2022, Tyro's shares dropped 18% after Westpac ends its takeover bid of the company, after it had joined the process in October. At the same time, Tyro announced that Potentia had raised its non-binding offer to $1.60, valuing the business at about $875 million. However, its Board rejected that offer.

On 22 May 2023, Tyro's shares dropped nearly 20% after it announced that Potentia had dropped their pursuit.

== See also ==
- Afterpay
