= Basement =

Floor of a building which is below grade

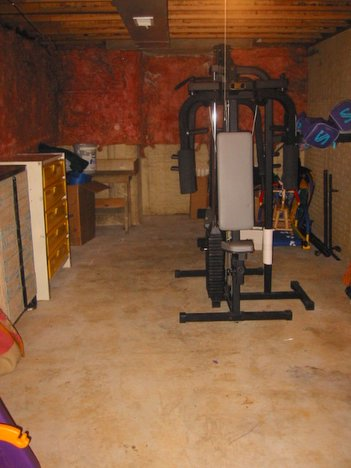
An unfinished basement used for storage and exercise

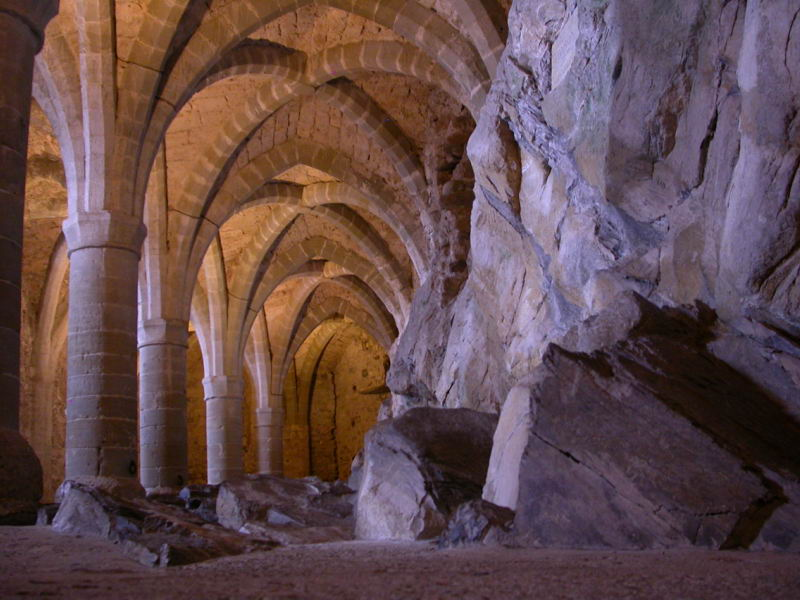
Chillon Castle (Château de Chillon) basement

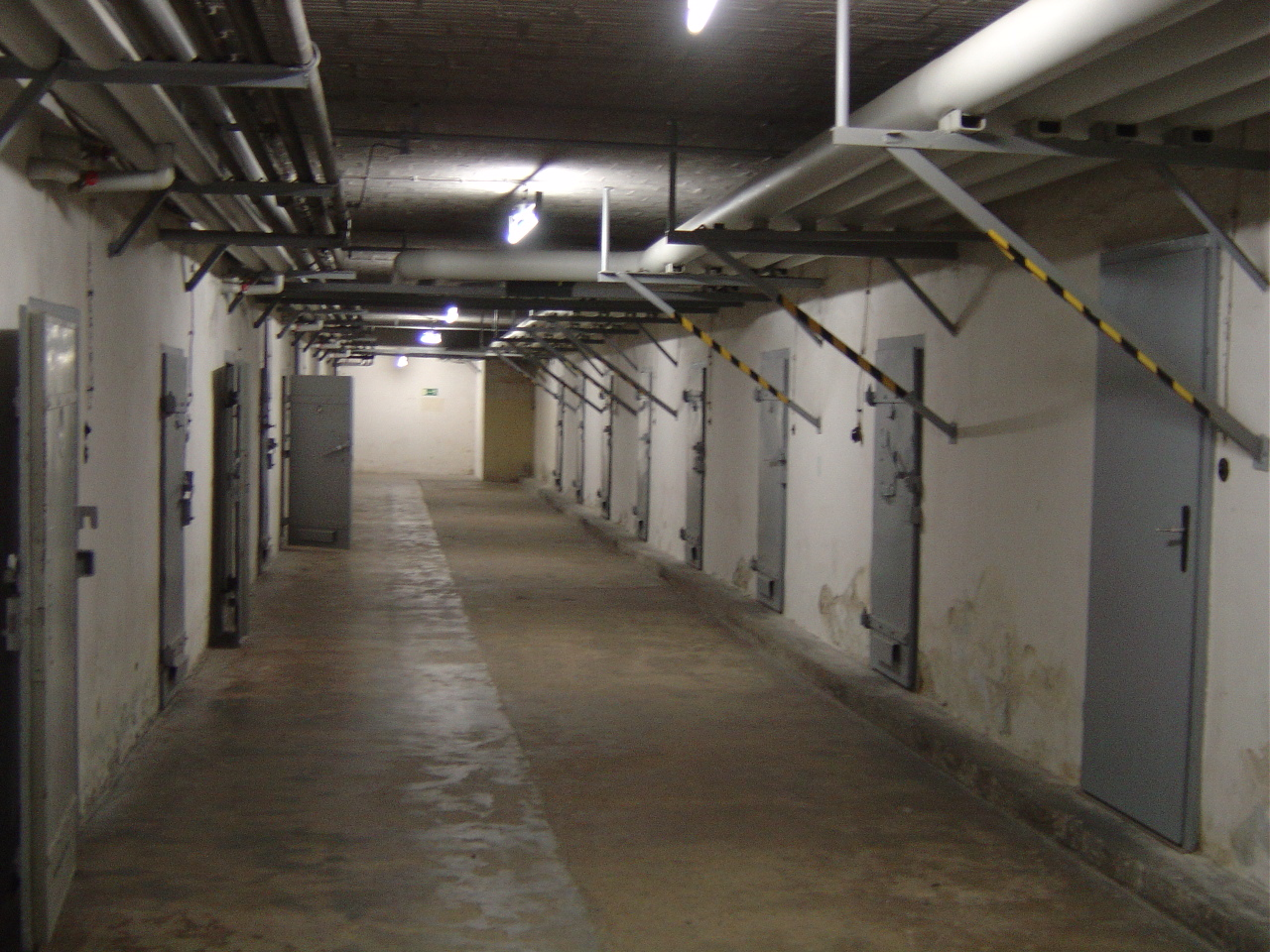
A former Stasi basement hallway

A basement is any floor level of a building that is largely or completely beneath the ground. Especially in residential buildings, it often is used as a utility space for a building, where items such as the furnace, water heater, breaker panel or fuse box, car park, and air-conditioning system are located; so also are amenities such as the electrical system and cable television distribution point. In cities with high property prices, such as London, basements are often fitted out to a high standard and used as living space.

In British English, the word basement is usually used for underground floors of, for example, department stores. The word is usually used with buildings when the space below the ground floor is habitable and with (usually) its own access. The word cellar applies to the whole underground level or to any large underground room. A subcellar or subbasement is a level that lies below the basement or cellar.

== Purpose, geography, and history ==
A basement can be used in almost exactly the same manner as an additional above-ground floor of a house or other building. However, the use of basements depends largely on factors specific to a particular geographical area such as climate, soil, seismic activity, building technology, and real estate economics.

Basements in small buildings such as single-family detached houses are rare in wet climates such as Great Britain and Ireland where flooding can be a problem, though they may be used in larger structures. However, basements are considered standard on all but the smallest new buildings in many places with temperate continental climates such as the American Midwest and the Canadian Prairies where a concrete foundation below the frost line is needed in any case, to prevent a building from shifting during the freeze-thaw cycle. Basements are much easier to construct in areas with relatively soft soils and may be avoided in places where the soil is too compact for easy excavation. Their use may be restricted in earthquake zones, because of the possibility of the upper floors collapsing into the basement; on the other hand, they may be required in tornado-prone areas as a shelter against violent winds. Adding a basement can also reduce heating and cooling costs as it is a form of earth sheltering, and a way to reduce a building's surface area-to-volume ratio. The housing density of an area may also influence whether or not a basement is considered necessary.

Historically, basements have become much easier to build (in developed countries) since the industrialization of home building. Large powered excavation machines such as backhoes and front-end loaders have dramatically reduced the time and manpower needed to dig a basement as compared to digging by hand with a spade, although this method may still be used in the developing world.

For most of its early history, the basement took one of two forms. It could be little more than a cellar, or it could be a section of a building containing rooms and spaces similar to those of the rest of the structure, as in the case of basement flats and basement offices.

However, beginning with the development of large, mid-priced suburban homes in the 1950s, the basement, as a space in its own right, gradually took hold. Initially, it was typically a large, concrete-floored space, accessed by indoor stairs, with exposed columns and beams along the walls and ceilings, or sometimes, walls of poured concrete or concrete cinder block.

== Types ==
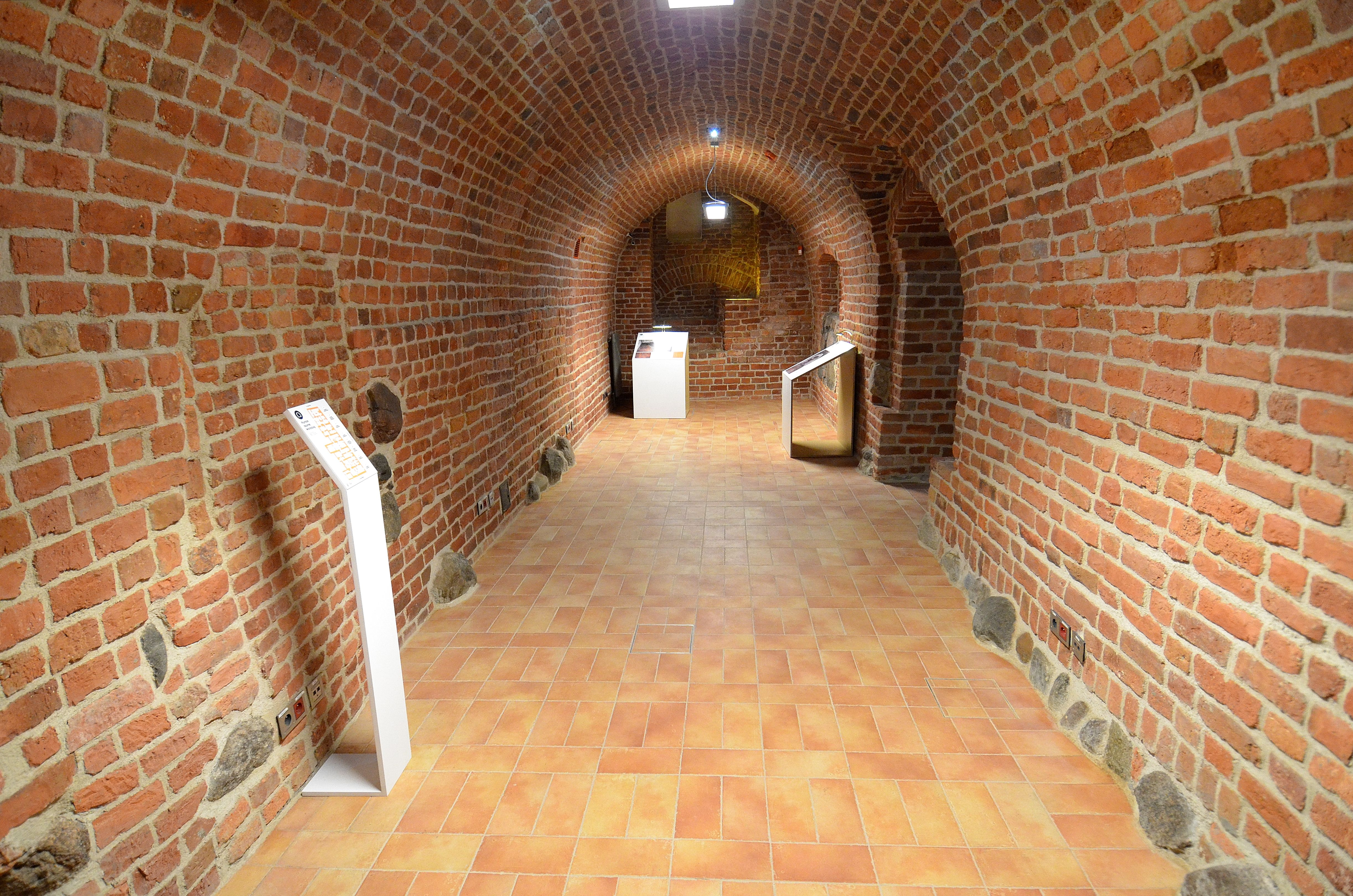
Old Town medieval basements in Warsaw

=== English basement ===
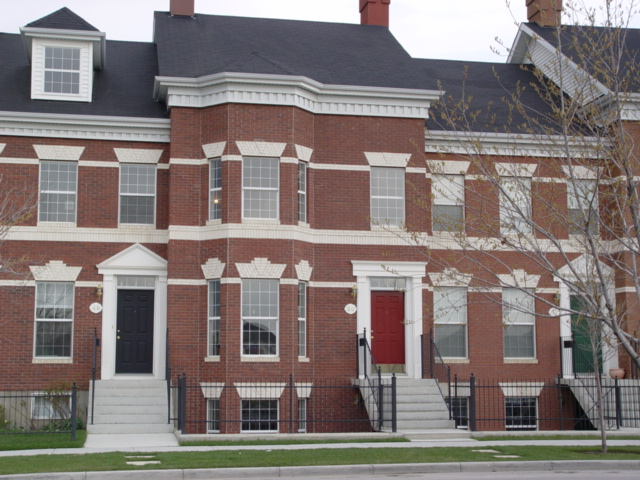
Townhouses with English basements

An English basement, also known as a daylight basement or lower ground floor, is contained in a house where at least part of the floor goes above ground to provide reasonably-sized windows. Generally, the floor's ceiling should be enough above ground to provide nearly full-size windows. Some daylight basements are located on slopes, such that one portion of the floor is at-grade with the land. A walk-out basement almost always results from this.

Most daylight basements naturally result from raised bungalows and at-grade walk-out basements. However, there are instances where the terrain dips enough from one side to another to allow for 3/4 to full-size windows, with the actual floor remaining below grade.

In most parts of North America, it is legal to set up apartments and bedrooms in daylight basements, whether or not the entire basement is above grade.

Daylight basements can be used for several purposes—as a garage, as maintenance rooms, or as living space. The buried portion is often used for storage, laundry room, hot water tanks, and HVAC.

Daylight basement homes typically appraise higher than standard-basement homes, since they include more viable living spaces. In some parts of the US, however, the appraisal for daylight basement space is half that of ground and above ground level square footage. Designs accommodated include split-foyer and split-level homes. Garages on both levels are sometimes possible. As with any multilevel home, there are savings on roofing and foundations.

=== Walk-out basement ===
A walk-out basement is any basement that is partially underground but nonetheless allows egress directly outdoors and has floating walls. This can either be through a stairwell leading above ground, or a door directly outside if a portion of the basement is completely at or above grade.

Many walk-out basements are also daylight basements. The only exceptions are when the entire basement is nearly entirely underground, and a stairwell leads up nearly a floor's worth of vertical height to lead to the outdoors.

Generally, basements with only an emergency exit well do not count as walk-out. Walk-out basements with at-grade doors on one side typically are more costly to construct since the foundation is still constructed to reach below the frost line. At-grade walk-out basements on the door-side are often used as livable space for the house, with the buried portion used for utilities and storage.

A walkout basement

=== Subbasement ===
A subbasement is a floor below the basement floor. In the homes where there is any type of basement mentioned above, such as a walk-out basement, all of the volume of the subbasements from floor to ceiling are located well below ground. Therefore, subbasements have no windows nor an outside door. In the homes that have subbasements, all of the basement can be used as part of the main home where people relax and do recreational things, while all of the subbasement can be used for storage. Subbasements are much more common in larger structures, such as commercial buildings and larger apartment buildings, than they are in single family homes. It is common for skyscrapers to have multiple subbasements.

Building a subbasement is more difficult, costly, and time-consuming than building a basement as the lowest floor. Subbasements are even more susceptible to flooding and water damage than basements and are therefore rare, except in dry climates and at higher elevations.

Some famous landmarks contain subbasements. The subbasement of the US Capitol Building is used as storage and that in the White House is used to store guest items.

=== Finished fully underground cellar ===
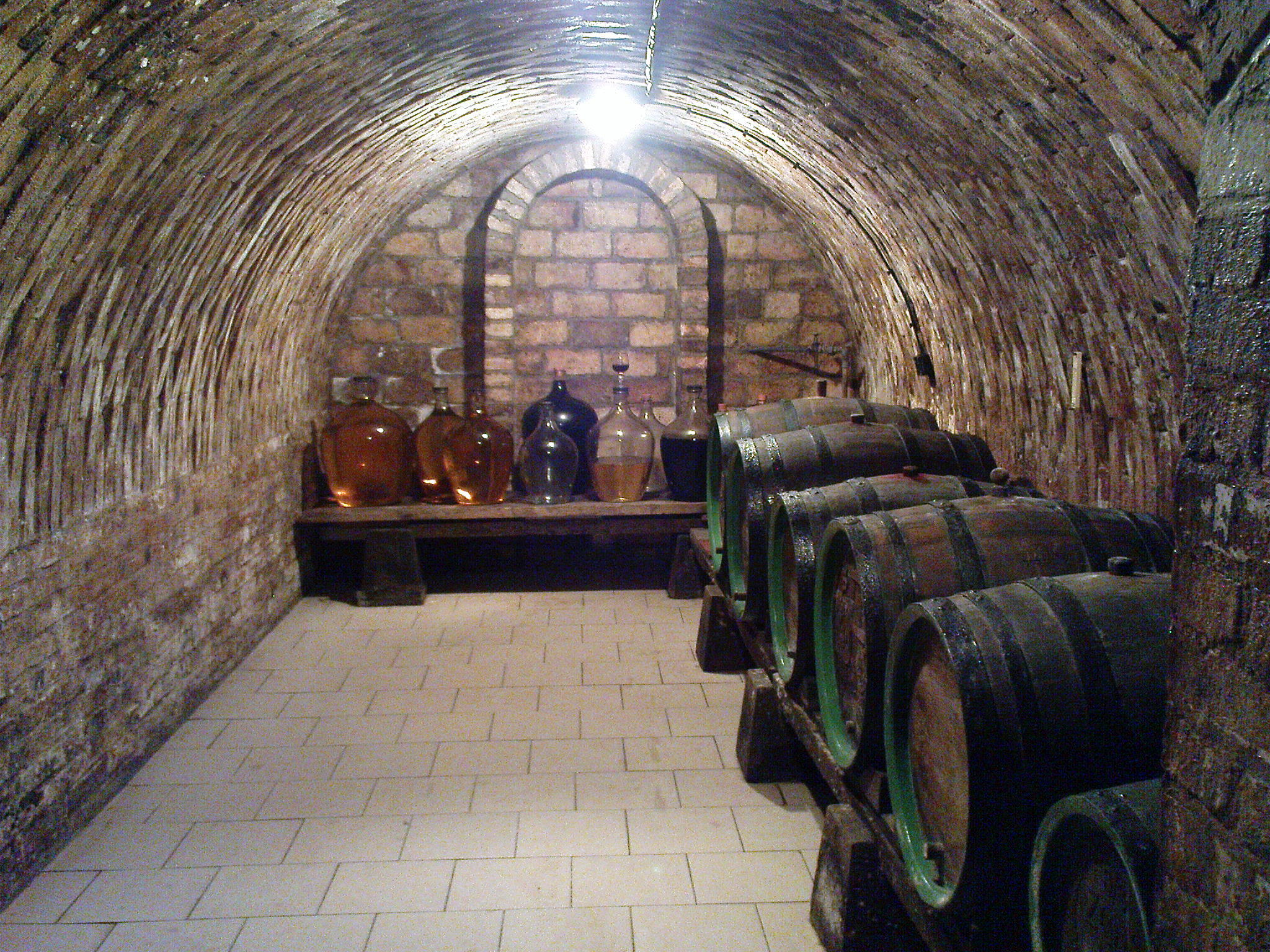
Wine cellar

According to the international Oxford Dictionary of English, a finished fully underground cellar is a room below ground level in a house that is often used for the storage of wine or coal; it may also refer to the stock of wine itself. A cellar is intended to remain at a constant cool (not freezing) temperature all year round and usually has either a small window/opening or some form of air ventilation (air/draught bricks, etc.) in order to help eliminate damp or stale air. Cellars are more common in the United Kingdom in older houses, with most terraced housing built during late 19th and early 20th centuries having cellars. These were important shelters from air raids during World War II. In parts of North America that are prone to tornadoes (e.g. Tornado Alley), cellars still serve as shelter in the event of a direct hit on the house from a tornado or other storm damage caused by strong winds.

Except for Britain, Australia and New Zealand, cellars are popular in most western countries. In the United Kingdom, almost all new homes built since the 1960s have no cellar or basement due to the extra cost of digging down further into the sub-soil and a requirement for much deeper foundations and waterproof tanking. The reverse has recently become common, where the impact of smaller home-footprints has led to roof-space being utilised for further living space and now many new homes are built with third-floor living accommodation. For this reason, especially where lofts have been converted into living space, people tend to use garages for the storage of food freezers, tools, bicycles, garden and outdoor equipment. The majority of continental European houses have cellars, although a large proportion of people live in apartments or flats rather than houses. In North America, cellars usually are found in rural or older homes on the coasts and in the South. However, full basements are commonplace in new houses in the Canadian and American Midwest and other areas subject to tornado activity or requiring foundations below the frost line.

=== Underground crawl space ===
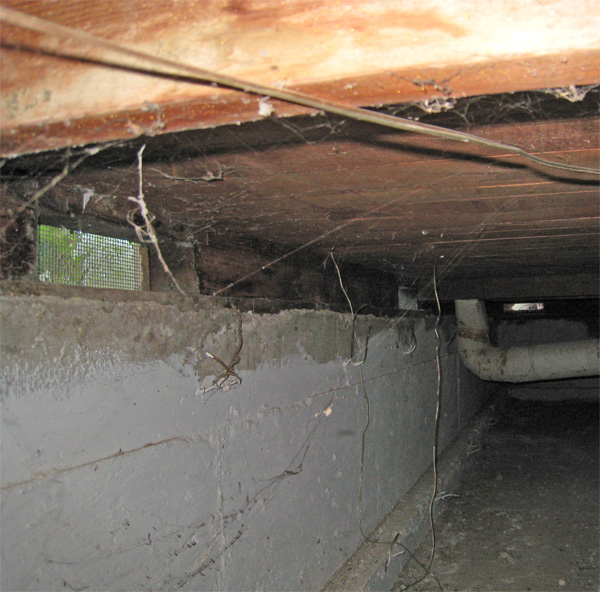
A typical crawl space showing crawl space vents and concrete rat-proofing. Rat-proofing is a thin, irregular concrete covering applied over the soil to prevent rodents from burrowing under the foundation wall and entering the crawl space.

An underground crawl space (as the name implies) is a type of basement in which one cannot stand up—the height may be as little as one foot (30 cm), and the surface is often soil. Crawl spaces offer a convenient access to pipes, substructures and a variety of other areas that may be difficult or expensive to access otherwise. While a crawl space cannot be used as living space, it can be used as storage, often for infrequently used items. Care must be taken in doing so, however, as water from the damp ground, water vapour (entering from crawl space vents), and moisture seeping through porous concrete can create a perfect environment for mold/mildew to form on any surface in the crawl space, especially cardboard boxes, wood floors and surfaces, drywall and some types of insulation.

Health and safety issues must be considered when installing a crawl space. As air warms in a home, it rises and leaves through the upper regions of the house, much in the same way that air moves through a chimney. This phenomenon, called the "stack effect", causes the home to suck air up from the crawl space into the main area of the home. Mould spores, decomposition odours, and material from dust mites in the crawl space can come up with the air, aggravating asthma and other breathing problems, and creating a variety of health concerns.

It is usually desirable to finish a crawl space with a plastic vapour barrier that will not support mold growth or allow humidity from the earth into the crawl space. This helps insulate the crawl space and discourages the habitation of insects and vermin by breaking the ecological chain in which insects feed off the mould and vermin feed on the insects, as well as creating a physical inorganic barrier that deters entrance into the space. Vapour barriers can end at the wall or be run up the wall and fastened to provide even more protection against moisture infiltration. Some pest control agencies recommend against covering the walls, as it complicates their job of inspection and spraying. Almost unheard of as late as the 1990s, vapour barriers are becoming increasingly popular in recent years. In fact, the more general area of conditioned vs. unconditioned crawl spaces has seen much research over the last decade.

Dry rot and other conditions detrimental to buildings (particularly wood and timber structures) can develop in enclosed spaces. Providing adequate ventilation is thought to reduce the occurrence of these problems. Crawl space vents are openings in the wall which allow air movement. Such vents are usually fitted with metal grating, mesh, or louvers which can block the movement of rodents and vermin but generally not insects such as termites and carpenter ants. One common rule is to provide vents in cross sectional area equal to 1/150 of the floor area served.

Modern crawl space thinking has reconsidered the usage of crawl space vents in the home. While crawl space vents do allow outside air to ventilate into the home, the ability of that air to dry out the crawl space is debatable. In areas with humid summers, during the summer months, the air vented into a crawl space will be humid, and as it enters the crawl space, which has been cooled naturally by the earth, the relative humidity of the air will rise. In those cases, crawl space vents can even increase the humidity level of a crawl space and lead to condensation on cool surfaces within, such as metal and wood. In the winter, crawl space vents should be shut off entirely, to keep out the cold winter air which can cool hot water pipes, furnaces, and water heaters stored within. During rainy weather, crawl space vents bring wet air into the crawl space, which will not dry the space effectively.

== Design and structural considerations ==
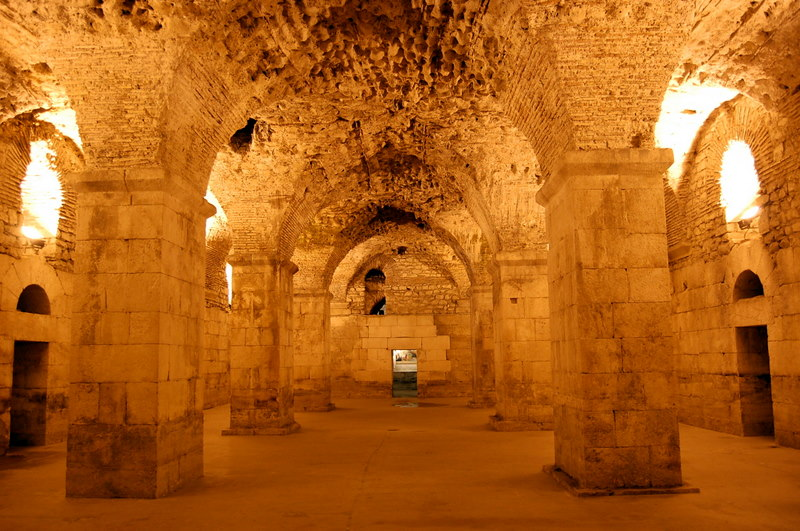
Basement of Diocletian's Palace

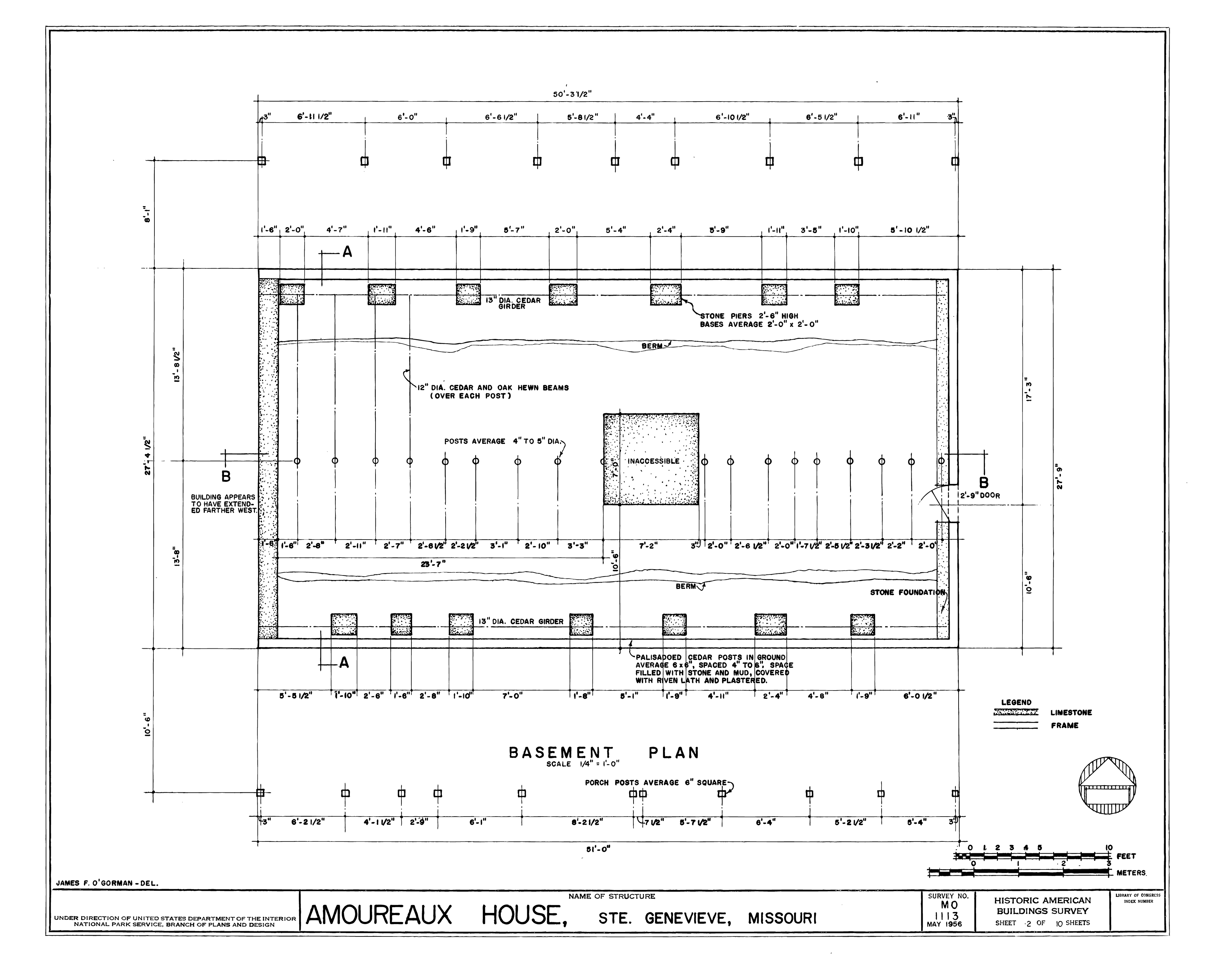
Measured drawing showing basement plan and structural foundations of the Amoureaux House in Ste. Geneviève, Missouri

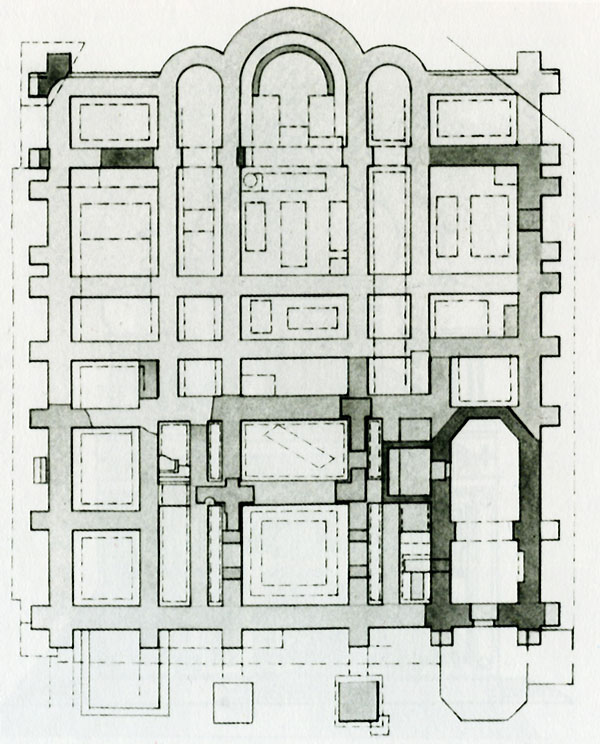
Floorplan of Church of Tithes, Kyiv, prior to 1828 rebuild

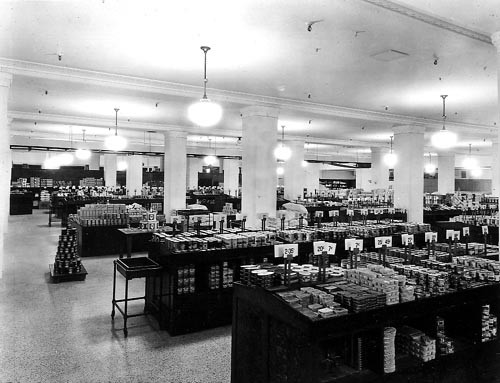
Grocery department in basement of T. Eaton's company, Calgary, Alberta, Canada (1929)

Structurally, for houses, the basement walls typically form the foundation. In warmer climates, some houses do not have basements because they are not necessary (although many still prefer them). In colder climates, the foundation must be below the frost line. Unless constructed in very cold climates, the frost line is not so deep as to justify an entire level below the ground, although it is usually deep enough that a basement is the assumed standard. In places with oddly stratified soil substrata or high water tables, such as most of Florida, Texas, Oklahoma, Arkansas, and areas within 50 miles (80 km) of the Gulf of Mexico, basements are usually not financially feasible unless the building is a large apartment or commercial structure.

Excavation using a backhoe or excavator is commonly used to dig a basement. If shelf rock is discovered, the need for blasting may be cost prohibitive. Basement walls may need to have the surrounding earth backfilled around them to return the soil to grade. A water stop, some gravel and a french drain may need to be used to prevent water from entering the basement at the bottom of the wall. Walls below grade may need to be sealed with an impervious coating (such as tar) to prevent water seepage. A polyethylene of about 6 mil (visqueen) serves as a water barrier underneath the basement.

Some designs elect to simply leave a crawl space under the house, rather than a full basement due to structural challenges. Most other designs justify further excavations to create a full-height basement, sufficient for another level of living space. Even so, basements in Canada and the northern United States were typically only 7 feet 10 inches (2.39 m) in height, rather than the standard full 8 feet (2.44 m) of the main floors. Older homes may have even lower basement heights as the basement walls were concrete block and thus, could be customized to any height. Modern builders offer higher basements as an option. The cost of the additional depth of excavation is usually quite expensive. Thus, houses almost certainly never have multi-storey basements though 9 feet (2.74 m) basements heights are a frequent choice among new home buyers. For large office or apartment buildings in prime locations, the cost of land may justify multi-storey basement parking garages.

The concrete floor in most basements is structurally not part of the foundation; only the basement walls are. If there are posts supporting a main floor beam to form a post and beam system, these posts typically go right through the basement floor to a footing underneath the basement floor. It is the footing that supports the post and the footing is part of the house foundation. Load-bearing wood-stud walls rest directly on the concrete floor. Under the concrete floor is typically gravel or crushed stone to facilitate draining. The floor is typically four inches (100 mm) thick and it rests on top of the foundation footings. The floor is typically sloped towards a drain point, in case of leaks.

Modern construction for basement walls typically falls into one of two categories: they will be made of poured-in-place concrete using concrete forms with a concrete pump, or they will use concrete masonry units (block walls). Rock may also be used, but is less common. In monolithic architecture, large parts of the building are made of concrete; in insulating concrete form construction, the concrete walls may be hidden with an exterior finish or siding. Inside the structure, a single Lally column, steel basement jack, wooden column or support post may hold up the floor above in a small basement. A series of these supports may be necessary for large basements; many basements have the support columns exposed.

Since warm air rises, basements are typically cooler than the rest of the house. In summer, this makes basements damp, due to the higher relative humidity. Dehumidifiers are recommended. In winter, additional heating, such as a fireplace or baseboard heaters may be required. A well-defined central heating system may minimize this requirement. Heating ducts typically run in the ceiling of the basement (since there is not an empty floor below to run the ducts). Ducts extending from the ceiling down to the floor help heat the cold floors of the basement. Older or cheaper systems may simply have the heating vent in the ceiling of the basement.

The finished floor is typically raised off the concrete basement floor. In countries such as Canada, laminate flooring is an exception: It is typically separated from the concrete by only a thin foam underlay. Radiant heating systems may be embedded within the concrete floor. Even if unfinished and unoccupied, basements are heated in order to ensure relative warmth of the floor above, and to prevent water supply pipes, drains, etc. from freezing and bursting in winter. It is recommended that the basement walls be insulated to the frost line. In Canada, the walls of a finished basement are typically insulated to the floor with vapor barriers to prevent moisture transmission. However, a finished basement should avoid wood or wood-laminate flooring, and metal framing and other moisture resistant products should be used. Finished basements can be costly to maintain due to deterioration of waterproofing materials or lateral earth movement etc. Below-ground structures will never be as dry as one above ground, and measures must be taken to circulate air and dehumidify the area.

== Drainage considerations ==
Basement floor drains that connect to sanitary sewers need to be filled regularly to prevent the trap from drying out and sewer gas from escaping into the basement. The drain trap can be topped up automatically by the condensation from air conditioners or high-efficiency furnaces. A small tube from another downpipe is sometimes used to keep the trap from drying out. Health Canada advocates the use of special radon gas traps for floor drains that lead to soil or to a sealed sump pump. In areas where storm and sanitary sewers are combined, and there is the risk of flooding and sewage backing up, backwater valves in all basement drains may be mandated by code and definitely are recommended even if not mandated.

The main water cut-off valve is usually in the basement. Basements often have "clean outs" for the sanitary and storm sewers, where these pipes can be accessed. The storm sewer access is only needed where the weeping tiles drain into the storm sewers.

Other than with walk-out or look-out basements, windows in basements require a window well and are below grade. A clear window well cover may be required to keep the wells from accumulating rain water. There should be drains in the window well, connected to the foundation drains.

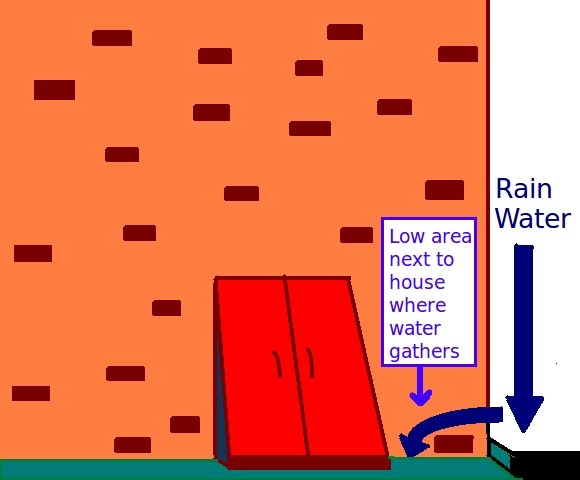
Water can seep into a basement from elevated places nearby, such as a raised driveway. Solutions include re-mortaring bricks, putting silicone in cracks, elevating areas next to exterior walls, and sloping gutters so water flows away from the house.

If the water table outside the basement is above the height of the basement floor, then the foundation drains or the weeping tiles outside the footings may be insufficient to keep the basement dry. A sump pump may be required. It can be located anywhere and is simply in a well that is deeper than the basement floor.

Even with functioning sump pumps or low water tables, basements may become wet after rainfall, due to improper drainage. The ground next to the basement must be graded such that water flows away from the basement wall. Downspouts from roof gutters should drain freely into the storm sewer or directed away from the house. Downspouts should not be connected to the foundation draintiles. If the draintiles become clogged by leaves or debris from the rain gutters, the roof water would cause basement flooding through the draintile. Damp-proofing or waterproofing materials are typically applied to outside of the basement wall. It is virtually impossible to make a concrete wall waterproof, over the long run, so drainage is the key. There are draining membranes that can be applied to the outside of the basement that create channels for water against the basement wall to flow to the foundation drains.

Where drainage is inadequate, waterproofing may be needed. There are numerous ways to waterproof a basement, but most systems fall into one of three categories:

- Tanking – Systems that bond to the basement structure and physically hold back groundwater.
- Cavity drainage – Dimpled plastic membranes are used to line the floors and walls of the basement, creating a "drained cavity." Any water entering this drained cavity is diverted to a sump pump and pumped away from the basement.
- Exterior foundation drain – Installing an exterior foundation drain that will drain away by gravity is the most effective means to waterproof a basement. An exterior system allows water to flow away from the basement without using pumps or electricity. An exterior drain also allows for the installation of a waterproof membrane to the foundation walls.

The waterproofing system can be applied to the inside or the outside walls of a basement. When waterproofing existing basements it is much cheaper to waterproof the basement on the inside. Waterproofing on the outside requires the expense of excavation, but does offer a number of advantages for a homeowner over the long term. Among them are:

- Gravity system
- No pumps or electrical wiring required
- Membrane applied to exterior walls to prevent dampness, mold, moisture, and soil gases from entering the home
- Permanent solution

== Basement culture and finishings ==
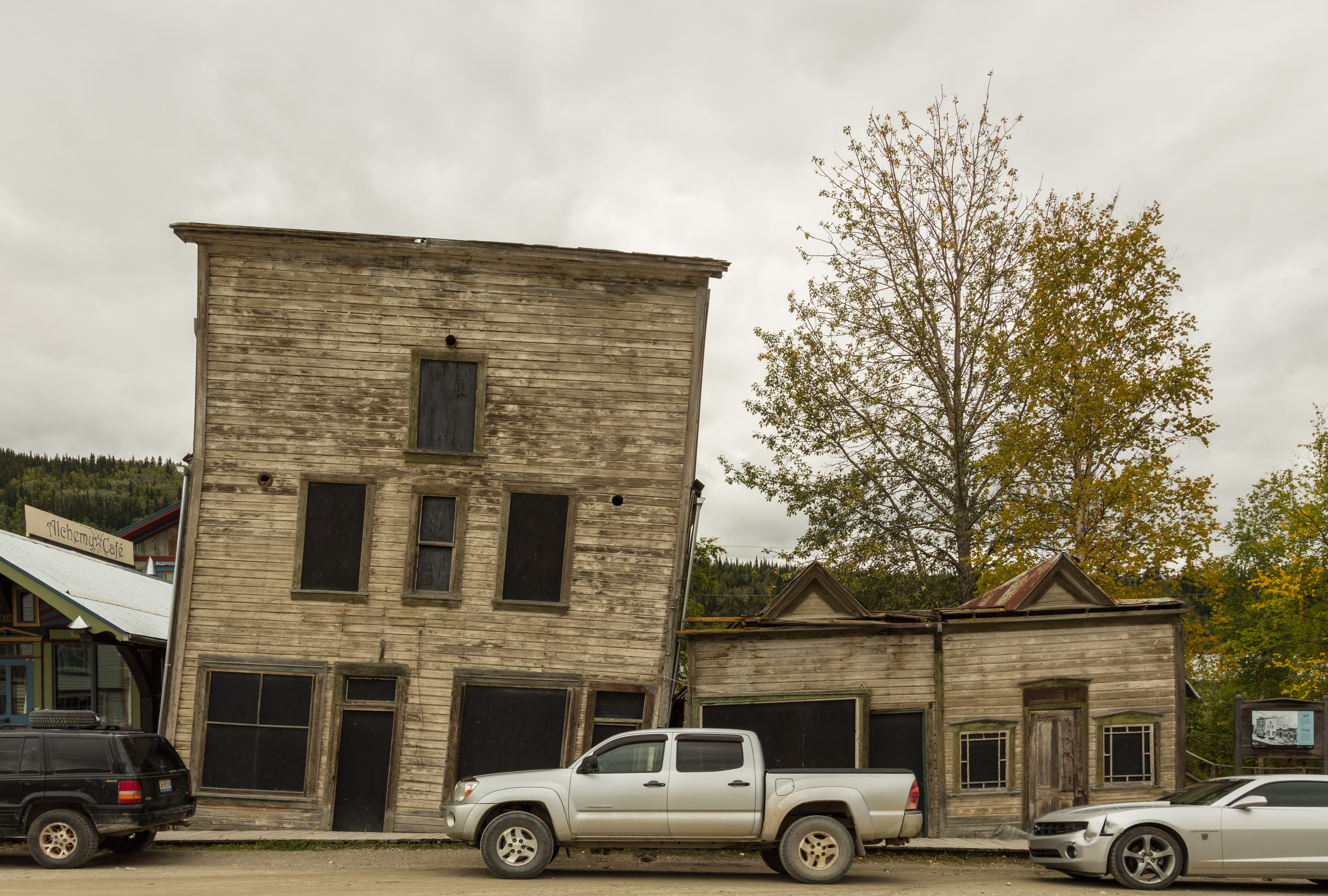
Example of the result of houses constructed in the beginning of the 20th century in Dawson City (Yukon Territory) without a basement

=== Unfinished basement ===
The unfinished design, found principally in spaces larger than the traditional cellar, is common in residences throughout the U.S. and Canada. One usually finds within it a water heater, various pipes running along the ceiling and downwards to the floor, and sometimes a workbench, a freezer or refrigerator, and a laundry set (usually found in older homes). Boxes of various materials, and objects unneeded in the rest of the house, are also often stored there; in this regard, the unfinished basement takes the place both of the cellar and of the attic. Home workshops are often located in the basement, since sawdust, metal chips, and other mess or noise are less of a nuisance there. Sometimes, if the laundry is found in the basement, a laundry chute collects dirty laundry from the upper floors of the house. The basement can contain all of these objects and still be considered to be "unfinished", as they are either mostly or entirely functional in purpose.

=== Finished basement ===
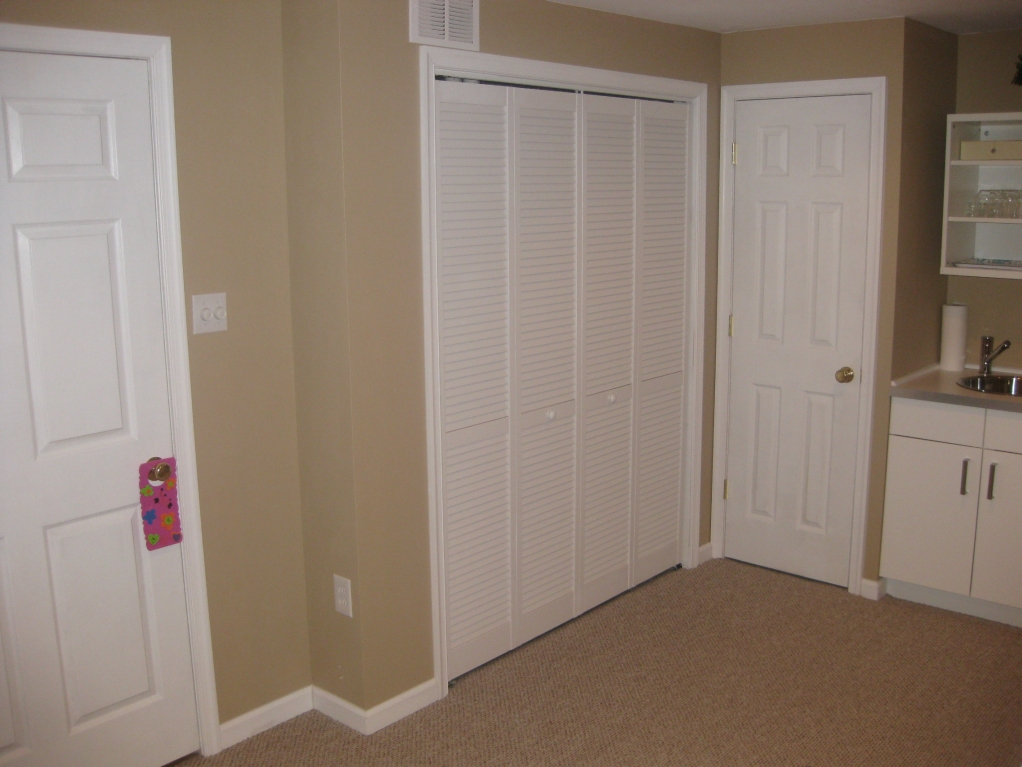
A finished basement

In this case the space has been designed, either during construction or at a later point by the owners, to function as a fully habitable addition to the house. Frequently most or all of the basement is used as a recreation room or living room, but it is not uncommon as well to find there (either instead of or alongside the living/recreation room) a guest bedroom or teenager's room, a bathroom, a home office, a home gym, a home theater, a basement bar, a sauna, craft room, play room, kitchenette, and one or more closets. Usually a part of the basement is unfurnished and is used for storage, a workshop, and/or a laundry room; when this is the case the water heater and furnace will also often be located there, although in some cases the entire basement is finished, and the water heater and furnace are boxed off into a closet.

=== Partially finished basement ===
The main point of distinction between this type of basement and the two others lies in its being either entirely unmodified (unlike the finished basement) beyond the addition of furniture, recreational objects and appliances, and/or exercise equipment on the bare floor, or slightly modified through the installation (besides any or all of the aforementioned items) of loose carpet and perhaps simple light fixtures. In both cases, the objects found there—many of which could be found in a finished basement as well—might include the following: weight sets and other exercise equipment; the boom boxes or entertainment systems used during exercise; musical instruments (which are not in storage, as they would technically be in an unfinished basement; an assembled drum set would be the most easily identified of these); football tables, chairs, couches and entertainment appliances of lesser quality than those in the rest of the house; refrigerators, stand-alone freezers, and microwaves (the first and the second being also sometimes used as supplementary storage units in an unfinished basement); and sports pennants and/or other types of posters which are attached to the walls.

As the description suggests, this type of basement, which also might be called "half-finished", is likely used by teenagers and children. The entire family might utilize a work-out area. It is also common to have a secondary (or primary) home office in a partially finished basement, as well as a man cave, workbench and/or a space for laundry appliances.

Toilets and showers sometimes exist in this variety of basement, as many North American basements are designed to allow for their installation.

=== Fully finished basement – retro fit ===
In London the construction of finished retrofit basements is big business with a large number of projects in the 100–200 square meter bracket. There are a smaller number of projects in the 200–500 square meter bracket under construction. It is also not unusual to see multi-level retrofit basements. These are considerable works of civil engineering and require some skill and intuitive understanding as well as good engineering. Some of the more grandiose of these basement projects have been widely reported in the national media, including the "Witanhurst" project in the Highgate area of London. and the huge iceberg-like homes which are beginning to be constructed in prime London areas such as Kensington and Chelsea.

=== Use in hospitals ===
Hospitals often place their nuclear chemistry and radiation therapy and diagnostic resources in basements to utilize the shielding from the earth.

== Real estate floorspace measures ==
In Canada, historically the basement area was excluded from advertised square footage of a house as it was not part of the living space. For example, a "2,000-square-foot bungalow" would, in reality, have 4,000 square feet (370 m^{2}) of floor space. More recently, finished space has become increasingly acceptable as a measure which includes the developed basement areas of a home. Due to fire code requirements, most jurisdictions require an emergency egress (through either egress-style windows, or, in the case of a walk-out basement, a door) to include the basement square footage as living space.

== See also ==
- Coal hole
- Loft conversions in the United Kingdom
