= First Colony Life Insurance Company =

Genworth Life & Annuity Insurance Company
- Formerly: First Colony Life (FCL)
- Industry: Life insurance
- Founded: 1955
- Founder: Edwin Horner
- Headquarters: Lynchburg, Virginia

First Colony Life (FCL) was an American life insurance company based in Lynchburg, Virginia that was acquired in 1996 by GE Financial Assurance (a subsidiary of General Electric), and later became Genworth Life and Annuity Insurance Company, a Genworth Financial company in 2007. First Colony Life was one of the first life insurance companies to market term life insurance products through the fledgling independent brokerage general agency (BGA) distribution model instead of relying upon a captive career sales force in the 1950s.

== History ==
Founded by Edwin Horner in 1955, the company grew from a local term life insurance company in Lynchburg, Virginia, specializing in impaired risk underwriting into a national provider of life insurance and annuity products.

Beginning in 1996 GE Capital’s acquired the company and First Colony Life experienced accelerated growth and expansion. Employment nearly doubled from 800 employees in 1996 to more than 1,500 employees in 1999, including more than 750 employees at a new separate Customer Service Center facility in Lynchburg.

BGA distribution continued as First Colony Life's primary life insurance and annuity sales channel with a sales force of more than 135,000 independent life insurance agents and brokers.

On January 1, 2007, First Colony Life Insurance Company merged into Genworth Life and Annuity Insurance Company, a Genworth Financial company.

=== key dates ===
- 1955: First Colony Life Insurance Company founded by Edwin Horner in Lynchburg, VA.
- 1963: Broadway-Hale, a California department store chain (later Carter Hawley Hale Stores), purchases controlling interests in FCL.
- 1965: Los Angeles Investment Company buys out Broadway-Hale's majority stock block. George Stewart becomes president and leads the company to national prominence in the life insurance and annuity markets.
- 1968: FCL renovates the former Guggenheimer department store building on Main Street in Lynchburg as its home office.
- 1971: FCL purchases its parent company, Los Angeles Investment Company.
- 1972: FCL purchases American Mayflower Insurance Company of New York to expand into the separate New York market.
- 1981: FCL is the third company to market a new type of insurance product called universal life insurance, now a common life insurance option.
- 1982: Ethyl Corporation, Richmond, VA, purchases FCL's outstanding stock for $270 million.
- 1992: Ethyl offers initial public offering of 8.6 million shares of First Colony Corporation, holding company for First Colony Life Insurance Company. Ron Dolan becomes president of FCL: Mr. Stewart becomes chairman of the board.
- 1993: Ethyl spins off remaining 80 percent interest in FCL (40 million shares). First Colony Corporation becomes a 100 percent publicly held company with subsidiaries First Colony Life Insurance Company and American Mayflower Life Insurance Company of New York.
- 1996: The General Electric Company (GE), through the GE Capital Corporation, purchased First Colony Life for $1.8 billion as part of its financial services segment, GE Financial Assurance.
- 1999: George Zippel becomes president and CEO of FCL.
- 2003: GE spins off GE Financial Assurance and most of its insurance-related businesses into Genworth Financial, Inc.
- 2005: FCL offers term life insurance with a return of premium that includes enhanced cash value accumulation options and a loan feature, the first life insurance company to do so.
- 2007: FCL merges into Genworth Life and Annuity Insurance Company, a Genworth Financial company.
