= Genworth Financial =

American insurance company

Genworth Financial, Inc.

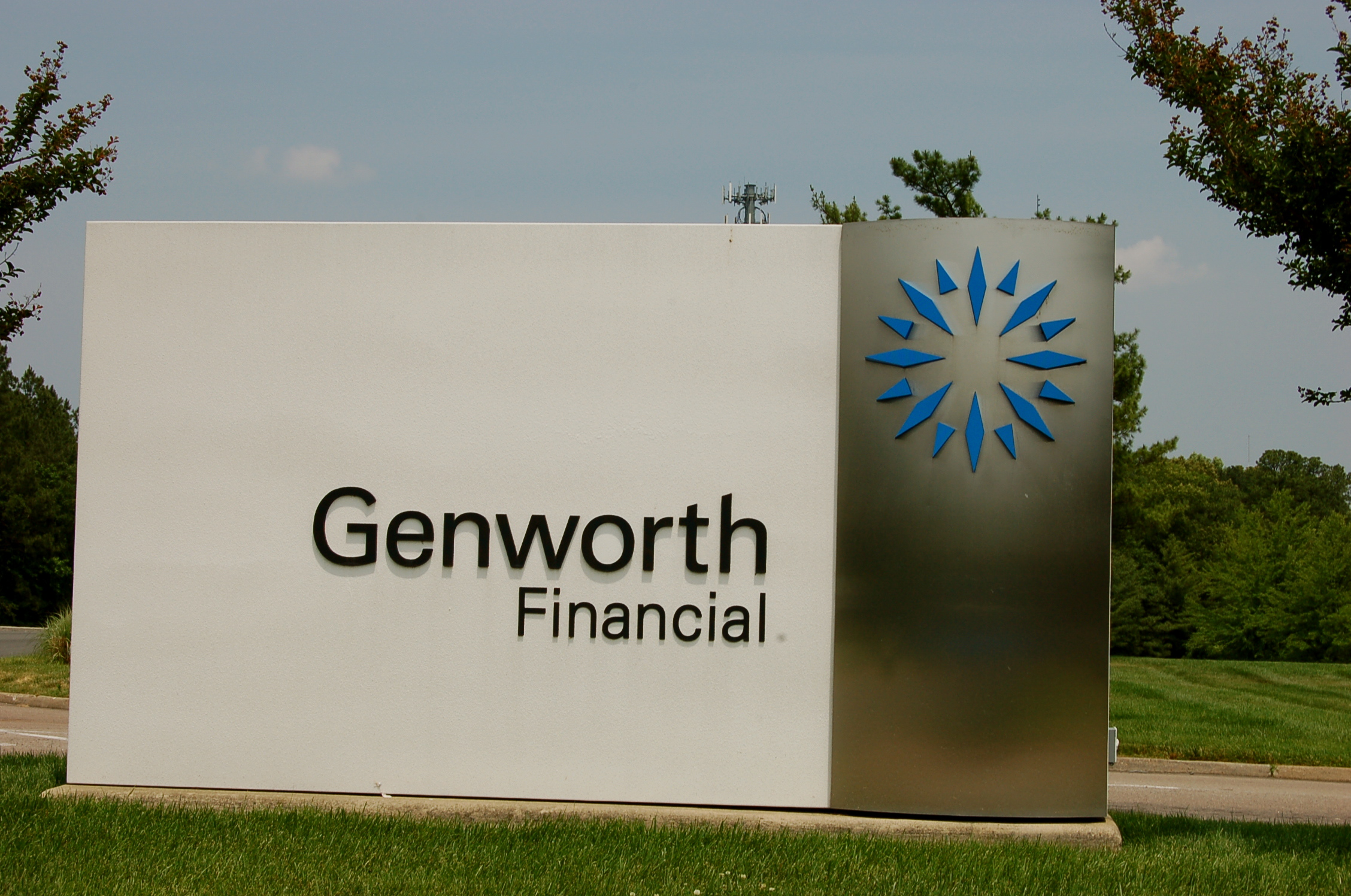
- Type: Public
- Traded as: NYSE: GNW (Class A); S&P 600 Component
- Industry: Financial services
- Founded: October 23, 2003; 22 years ago
- Headquarters: Henrico County, Virginia, United States,
- Key people: Tom McInerney (CEO)
- Products: Long-term care insurance Life Insurance; Annuities; Mortgage insurance
- Revenue: ▼US$7.507 billion (2022)
- Net income: ▼US$609 million (2022)
- Total assets: ▼US$86.442 billion (2022)
- Total equity: ▼US$9.984 billion (2022)
- Number of employees: Approximately 2,500 (2022)
- Website: www.genworth.com

Genworth Financial, headquartered in Richmond, Virginia, is an American financial services company. It provides life insurance, long-term care insurance, mortgage insurance, and annuities.

== History ==
The firm was founded as The Life Insurance Company of Virginia in 1871, in Petersburg, Virginia. Within a decade, the company expanded beyond the south and moved its headquarters to Richmond.

Beginning with its first annuities business written in 1928, the company grew to offer products for mortgage insurance, lifestyle protection, and long-term care insurance.

In 1986, Life of Virginia was acquired by Combined Insurance for $557 million.

It became Aon in 1987. In 1996, Life of Virginia was acquired by GE Capital.

The company was incorporated as Genworth Financial, Inc. in 2003, and it became a public company via an initial public offering in 2004.

GE sold its remaining stake in the company in February 2006 for $2.8 billion.

In June 2006, the company agreed to buy AssetMark Investment Services for $230 million.

In 2007, another GE Capital insurance company, First Colony Life Insurance Company, merged with the company's life insurance division and became the surviving entity.

In May 2007, the company sold its employee benefits business to Sun Life Financial.

In July 2007, the company acquired Liberty Reverse Mortgage, a reverse mortgage company, for $50 million. It sold the company to Ocwen for $22 million in April 2013.

In September 2007, the company sold its wealth management unit to private equity firms Aquiline Capital Partners and Genstar Capital Management for $412.5 million.

In June 2009, Genworth MI Canada, its Canadian mortgage insurance subsidiary, completed an initial public offering on the Toronto Stock Exchange, raising $850 million.

In June 2011, the company sold Continental Life Insurance, which provided Medigap insurance policies, to Aetna for $290 million.

In September 2012, the company sold Genworth Financial Investment Services, its financial adviser unit, to Cetera Financial Group.

In December 2012, Thomas McInerney was named CEO of the company.

On April 1, 2013, Genworth announced the completion of a legal entity reorganization, creating a new holding company and separating the U.S. mortgage insurance subsidiaries.

In December 2015, the company sold Genworth Lifestyle Protection Insurance to Axa for €465 million.

In January 2016, Protective Life acquired parts of the company for $661 million.

In February 2016, the company suspended sales of annuities and life insurance, putting the existing books of business into runoff.

In June 2016, the company sold its term life insurance platform to Pacific Life.

In October 2016, China Oceanwide Holdings Group agreed to buy the company for $2.7 billion. However, in April 2021, Genworth terminated the acquisition due to China Oceanwide's inability to close the acquisition.

In May 2020, the company's Australian mortgage insurance division, now called Helia, lost its contract with National Australia Bank.

In October 2020, Genworth MI Canada was renamed to Sagen MI Canada. In April 2021, Brookfield Business Partners acquired all of the outstanding common shares of Sagen that it did not already own.

In September 2021, the company completed the initial public offering of Enact Holdings, its private mortgage insurance subsidiary.

== Legal issues ==
=== Shareholder lawsuits ===
In March 2016, the company settled shareholder lawsuits for $219 million. The lawsuit alleged that Genworth and its management made false statements between October 30, 2013 and November 5, 2014 as the company had assured investors that the reserves it had set aside to cover long-term care claims were adequate. However the company had to take a $531 million charge to shore up its long-term care business, leading to a substantial drop in the price of Genworth's securities.

=== Life insurance premium increases ===
In October 2022, the company paid $25 million to policyholders to settle a class action lawsuit alleging that premium increases of 40% to 140% were excessive and unlawful.

=== MOVEit hack ===
On June 6, 2023, third-party vendor to Genworth, PBI Research Services, reported a vulnerability with their MOVEit Transfer software. The vulnerability resulted in a Russian-linked extortion group, named 'C|0p', gaining unlawful access to private data. Whilst PBI Research Services did report the vunlnerability, the company was criticised for not revealing the scope of the hack sooner. The software is used to track deaths of its member organisations so that payments can be issued to the relevant beneficiaries. Whilst a number of state and federal organisations were affected by the hack, between 2.5-2.7 million customers of Genworth Financial had their private data downloaded; including first and last name, date of birth and social security number. On June 22, 2023, Genworth filed a report with the Securities and Exchange Commission regarding the data breach.
