= FHA insured loan =

US Federal Housing Administration mortgage insurance

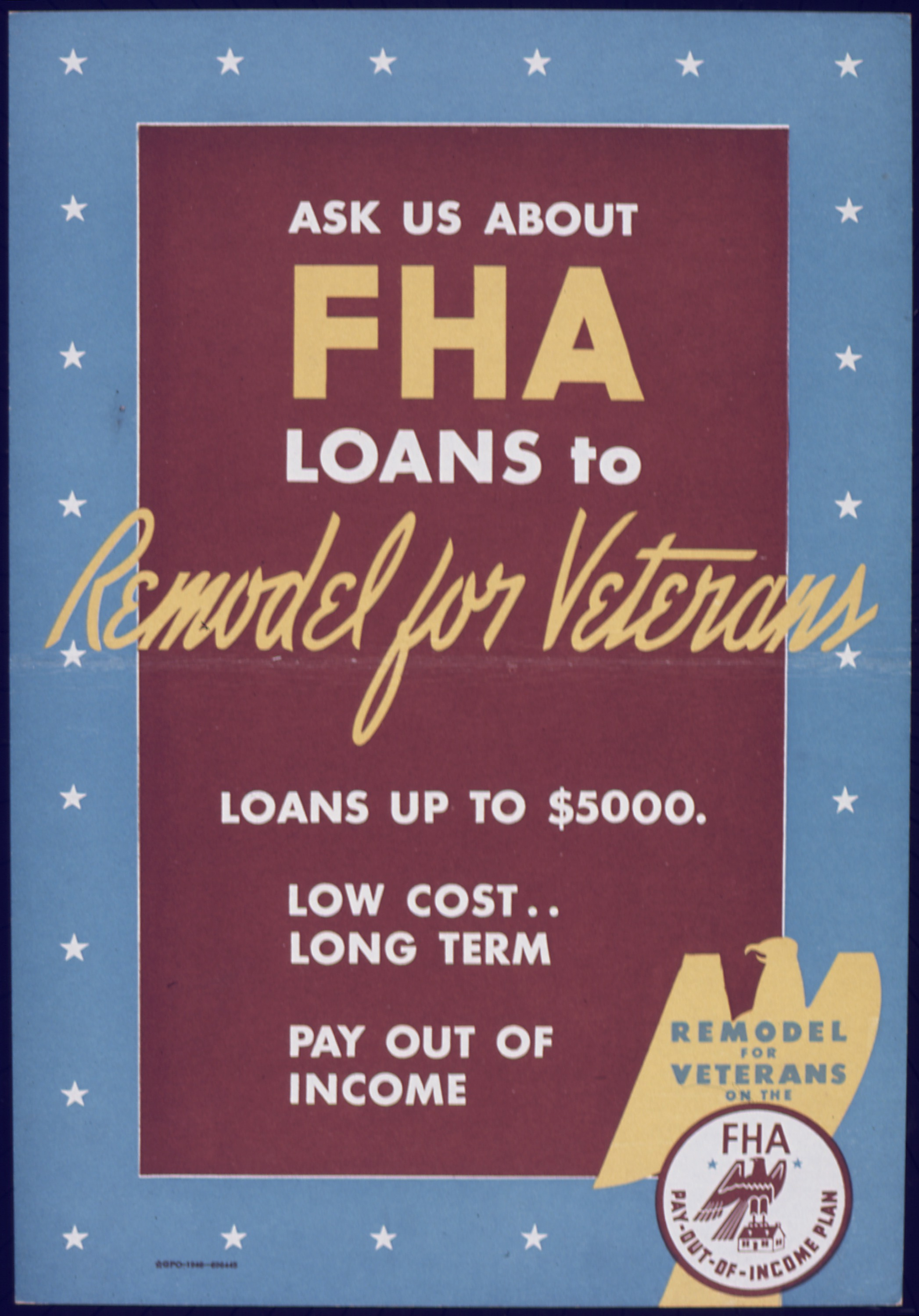
World War II poster

An FHA insured loan is a government-backed loan designed to help a broader range of Americans—particularly first-time homebuyers—achieve homeownership with more flexible credit, income, and down payment requirements than conventional loans. Offered through FHA-approved lenders and insured by the Federal Housing Administration, these loans are widely used today as a practical and accessible solution for individuals who may not qualify for traditional financing due to limited savings or credit history. FHA loans can be used to purchase, refinance, or renovate a primary residence, and are especially valuable for buyers seeking affordability and stability in their home financing.

The program was established in the 1930s during the Great Depression, a time when the housing market was paralyzed by widespread foreclosures and tightening credit. The federal government created the FHA to restore confidence in the housing sector by insuring mortgages, thus reducing risk for lenders and making it easier for families to secure long-term financing. Over the decades, the program has evolved but continues to fulfill its original purpose: expanding access to safe, sustainable homeownership for those who might otherwise be excluded from the market.

== History ==
The National Housing Act of 1934 created the Federal Housing Administration (FHA), which was established primarily to increase home construction, reduce unemployment, and operate various loan insurance programs. The FHA makes no loans, nor does it plan or build houses. As in the Veterans Administration's VA loan program, the applicant for the loan must make arrangements with a lending institution. This financial organization then may ask if the borrower wants FHA insurance on the loan or may insist that the borrower apply for it. Through the Federal Housing Administration, the federal government investigates the applicant and, having decided that the risk is favorable, insures the lending institution against loss of principal in case the borrower fails to meet the terms and conditions of the mortgage. The borrower, who pays an insurance premium of 0.5% on declining balances for the lender's protection, receives two benefits: a careful appraisal by an FHA inspector and a lower interest rate on the mortgage than the lender might have offered without the protection. In some states, the FHA inspection may be waived for smaller FHA loans, usually those not exceeding $30,000.

African Americans and other racial minorities were largely denied access to FHA-backed loans, especially before 1950, and only gained access in a handful of suburban developments specifically built for all-black occupancy. Under the Eisenhower Administration, FHA tried to coax private developers to build more housing for minority buyers. This was done through its Voluntary Home Credit Mortgage Program. However, less housing was built under the program than expected, and FHA refused to deny insurance to developers who discriminated. The way FHA-backed loans were administered contributed to widening homeownership and racial wealth gap, even as they helped to build the white middle-class family.

Until the latter half of the 1960s, the Federal Housing Administration served mainly as an insuring agency for loans made by private lenders. However, in recent years this role has been expanded as the agency became the administrator of interest rate subsidy and rent supplement programs. Important subsidy programs such as the Civil Rights Act of 1968 were established by the United States Department of Housing and Urban Development.

In 1974 the Housing and Community Development Act was passed. Its provisions significantly altered federal involvement in a wide range of housing and community development activities. The new law made a variety of changes in FHA activities, although it did not involve (as had been proposed) a complete rewriting and consolidation of the National Housing Act. However, it did include provisions relating to the lending and investment powers of federal savings and loan associations, the real estate lending authority of national banks, and the lending and depositary authority of federal credit unions.

Further changes occurred in the 1977 Housing and Community Development Act, which raised ceilings on single-family loan amounts for savings and loan association lending, federal agency purchases, FHA insurance, and security for Federal Home Loan Bank advances. In 1980 the Housing and Community Development Act was passed; it permitted negotiated interest rates on certain FHA loans and created a new FHA rental subsidy program for middle-income families.

On August 31, 2007, the FHA added a new refinancing program called FHA-Secure to help borrowers hurt by the 2007 subprime mortgage financial crisis. On March 6, 2008, the "FHA Forward" program was initiated. This is the part of the stimulus package that President George W. Bush had in place to raise the lending limits for each county in every state.

On April 1, 2012, the FHA enacted a new rule that requires their customers to settle with medical creditors in order to get a mortgage loan. This controversial change was rescinded and postponed until July 2012, but was later cancelled altogether pending clarification and additional guidance. By November 2012, the FHA was essentially bankrupt.

== Types of FHA mortgages ==
The Federal Housing Administration (FHA) insures several types of mortgage products designed to make homeownership more accessible to a wider range of borrowers. The most common type is the FHA Fixed-Rate Mortgage, which offers a stable interest rate for the life of the loan—typically in 15-year or 30-year terms. These loans provide predictability in monthly payments and are well-suited for borrowers planning to stay in their home long term.

FHA also insures Adjustable-Rate Mortgages (ARMs), which start with a fixed interest rate for an initial period (commonly 1, 3, 5, 7, or 10 years) and then adjust annually based on market conditions. These loans may appeal to borrowers who expect to move or refinance before the adjustable period begins, as they typically start with a lower interest rate than fixed-rate loans. Both types of FHA mortgages are subject to loan limits, mortgage insurance premiums (MIP), and borrower eligibility criteria, including minimum credit score and debt-to-income ratio requirements. In addition to purchase loans, FHA also backs refinance, rehabilitation (203(k)), and energy-efficient mortgage (EEM) products under its broader suite of programs.

== Mortgage insurance ==
All FHA loans require mortgage insurance premium (MIP) irrespective of the size of the mortgage, down payment, and credit score. The FHA employs a two-tiered mortgage insurance premium (MIP) schedule. To obtain mortgage insurance from the Federal Housing Administration, an upfront mortgage insurance premium (UFMIP) equal to 1.75% of the base loan amount at closing is required, and is normally financed into the total loan amount by the lender and paid to FHA on the borrower's behalf. There is also a monthly mortgage insurance premium (MIP) which varies based on the amortization term and loan-to-value ratio.

Borrowers who refinance an existing FHA loan into a new FHA-insured loan within three years may be eligible for a partial refund of the upfront mortgage insurance premium (UFMIP) originally paid at closing. The refund is applied as a credit toward the new UFMIP and decreases monthly, with no refund available after 36 months. This refund only applies to FHA-to-FHA refinances and is not available if the loan is paid off or refinanced into a non-FHA loan.

FHA mortgage insurance premium (MIP) can be removed in two cases: first, if the initial loan-to-value ratio was less than or equal to 90%, second, if the FHA loan is refinanced. In the first case, FHA MIP is automatically removed after 11 years on mortgages where the borrower made an initial down payment of equal to or greater than 10% of the home value. In the second case, FHA MIP can be removed if the borrower pays off or refinances the FHA loan into a conventional loan. FHA MIP rates were lowered January 27, 2017 FHA MIP is not cancellable for mortgages originated after June 3, 2013. Starting March 20, 2023, FHA insured loans have lowered their MIP rates by 30 bps across all scenarios, the most notable loans going from 85 bps down to 55 bps., ensuring affordability for Americans.

== Streamline Refinance ==
The FHA Streamline Refinance program is a simplified refinance option available to homeowners with existing FHA-insured mortgages. It allows eligible borrowers to refinance to a lower interest rate or switch from an adjustable-rate mortgage (ARM) to a fixed-rate loan with reduced documentation requirements. The key advantages of the Streamline Refinance include no appraisal requirement, no income verification, and limited credit review, making it especially useful in declining home value markets or when financial documentation is limited. Borrowers must be current on their mortgage, with no late payments in the past three months and no more than one late payment in the last 12 months. This program is unique to FHA home loans and is not available on conventional home mortgages.

== See also ==
- Government-backed loan
