= Misselling =

Sale that is misrepresented or unsuitable for the customer's needs

Misselling is the deliberate, reckless, or negligent sale of products or services in circumstances where the contract is either misrepresented, or the product or service is unsuitable for the customer's needs. For example, selling life insurance to someone who has no dependents is regarded as misselling. There is no legal definition of "misselling" in the UK.

== Types ==
Various common types of misselling may occur. More recently, banks have been at the center of misselling with products such as ISAs and investments. Another type of misselling is the one that took place in Cyprus during the period 2003-2010 where over 900 victims were missold foreign currency loans (mainly CHF) to finance the purchase of Cypriot lease holds.

Material misrepresentation

This may include misrepresentation of the commercial situation.

Suitability

The sale of unsuitable products, such as invalid insurance, is misselling, and has led to substantial compensation orders.

== Financial misselling ==
Financial misselling refers to deliberate false statement made by individual, usually a financial organization representative to sell off their financial products or services usually not profound to the customer. For example, HomeServe, an emergency home repair insurance company based in the United Kingdom, was fined £30m for misselling to its customers by the Financial Conduct Authority in February 2014, as they had failed to explain the actual price and the coverage of their financial products. According to a news in The Telegraph, Britain's financial services industry has payment protection insurance (PPI), (sold with credit cards) claims worth around £13bn from 2008 to early 2014. Another on going misselling scandal relates to interest rate swaps sold to small and medium enterprises by UK banks.

== Cyprus misselling ==
Between the years 2003 and 2010, Cypriot banks suggested to buyers interested in acquiring property in Cyprus to take out a mortgage in foreign currency loans (mainly CHF) because the interest rates were lower. Thousands of mainly British residents took this advice but this backfired when the franc soared after the 2008 financial crisis, and mortgage repayments doubled. Lawyers say that the banks often failed to explain the potential risks of currency fluctuation that could cause repayments to rise, and also applied heavy interest rate rises. Many people have struggled to keep up with their repayments.

Moreover, instead of an absolute title to their property, the Republic of Cyprus gave them rights to a property, which if and when built, would be in someone else's land and be subject to charges by lenders and other creditors until the titles could be separated. The separation of titles could take many years because instead of separating them before sale, the state accepts separation after the development is completed and proves fully compliant with planning. The chances of compliance are slim considering that planners require that they meet building regulations at the time of final inspection and not at the time permission was granted which ends up becoming a catch-up game between planners and developers. In the meantime, purchasers are at risk that the land could be foreclosed by creditors. In this way, the state punishes the purchasers for possible planning breaches by the developers while allowing creditors to have the benefit of security over the land on which off-plan units have been sold. All at the expense of foreign purchasers and in favor of local creditors.

This has resulted in property owners facing unsaleable and unlettable apartments, gigantic loan obligations and negative equity following the collapse of the Cypriot property market.

== Mortgage misselling Ireland ==
During the Celtic Tiger, 2002 to 2008, mortgage sales saw unprecedented growth. In order to establish greater market share, mortgage providers created variations in products that were unsuitable for the consumer but allowed the bank to issue larger mortgages to meet the demand caused by house price growth. Such variations included Interest Only, Payments passed Retirement Date and Self Certification of Income. As a result of these mis-sales, 113,000 home mortgages have since been sold to private equity firms. The problem is further compounded by the fact that there is no State body responsible for Consumer Protection. The Central Bank of Ireland is responsible for both Prudential Supervision and Consumer Protection. Consumers who think they might have a mis-sale claim should refer to the Irish Financial Services and Pensions Ombudsman (FSPO) or contact their provider. The FSPO upheld only 2% of consumers' complaints in 2022.

== See also ==
- Breach of confidence
