= Tredegar Corporation =

- Traded as: NYSE: TG
- Headquarters: Richmond, Virginia, United States
- Number of employees: Over 2800 (2015)
- Website: tredegar.com

Tredegar Corporation (NYSE: TG) is a publicly traded company that manufactures plastic films and aluminum extrusions. It is headquartered in Richmond, Virginia. This company was formed in 1989 when the aluminium, plastics, and energy units of Ethyl Corporation were spun-off. The energy-related assets were subsequently sold in 1994.
