= Down payment =

Upfront partial payment for the purchase of something expensive

In accounting, a down payment (also called a deposit in British English) is an initial up-front partial payment for the purchase of expensive goods or services such as a car or a house. It is usually paid in cash or equivalent at the time of finalizing the transaction. A loan of some sort is then required to finance the remainder of the payment.

The main purposes of a down payment is to ensure that the lending institution has enough capital to create money for a loan in fractional reserve banking systems and to recover some of the balance due on the loan in the event that the borrower defaults. In real estate, the asset is used as collateral in order to secure the loan against default. If the borrower fails to repay the loan, the lender is legally entitled to sell the asset and retain enough of the proceeds to repay the remaining balance on the loan, including fees and interest added. A down payment, in this case, reduces the lender's risk to less than the value of the collateral, making it more likely that the lender will recover the full amount in the event of default.

The size of the down payment thus determines the extent to which the lender is protected against the various factors that might reduce the value of the collateral, as well as lost profits between the time of the last payment and the eventual sale of the collateral.

Furthermore, making a down payment demonstrates that the borrower is able to raise a certain amount of money for long-term investment, which the lender may desire as evidence that the borrower's finances are sound, and that the borrower is not borrowing beyond their means.

If the borrower is unable to pay off the loan in its entirety, the down payment amount is forfeited.

== Amounts ==
In the United States, down payments for home purchases typically vary between 3.5% and 20% of the purchase price. The Federal Housing Administration has advocated lower down payments since its inception in 1934, and, currently, borrowers that qualify for an FHA loan pay only 3.5% for a down payment. With rising home prices in the years from 2000 to 2007, lenders were willing to accept smaller or no down payment (either through 100% financing, seller-assisted down payment assistance, government down payment providers or by providing a combination of an 80% first and 20% second mortgages) so that more individuals could purchase homes as their primary residences. Currently, in the United States, the Department of Veterans Affairs offers complete financing for qualifying veterans. The USDA Home Loan program also offers complete mortgage loans with no down payment. These loans are available as direct or guaranteed loans and are offered to qualifying borrowers purchasing a home in a more rural area. Most state finance housing agencies offer down payment assistance. Down Payment Assistance programs are all different with certain requirements for each. State or local housing authorities, a non-profit organization, or lender usually set the requirements and conditions for the DPA program. Some programs require you or your loan officer to take a short course on Down Payment Assistance for first time home buyers. Homebuyer assistance programs vary by state and can amount to up to three percent of the loan amount for down payment or closing costs. Some states have special programs supporting home purchases in selected geographic areas.

There is more risk for lenders when individuals purchase a home as an investment property. Therefore, the lender may charge a higher interest rate and expect a higher down payment.

== See also ==
- Foreclosure
- Mortgage insurance
