= Afton Chemical =

American petroleum additives company

Afton Chemical Corporation
- Type: Subsidiary of NewMarket Corp
- Industry: Chemicals
- Founded: 1877
- Headquarters: Richmond, Virginia, U.S.
- Area served: Worldwide
- Key people: Gina Harm (President)
- Products: Chemicals Petroleum Additives
- Website: aftonchemical.com

Afton Chemical Corporation is an American company that develops and manufactures petroleum additives. Among these are driveline, engine oil, fuel and industrial additives. Afton Chemical Corporation is headquartered in Richmond, Virginia, and has operations around the world. The company is a subsidiary of NewMarket Corporation, a corporation specializing in performance specialty chemicals.

== Operations ==
Afton Chemical products fall into four different strategic business units: driveline additives, engine oil additives, fuel additives, and industrial additives.

Driveline additives

This segment includes driveline additives for automatic (ATF), continuously variable (CVT) and dual-clutch (DCT) transmission types, as well as gear oil additives for rear-axle and manual transmissions.

Engine oil additives

Afton Chemical offers engine oil additives for passenger car, motorcycle, medium speed diesel and heavy-duty engines, as well as olefin copolymer viscosity index improvers.

Fuel additives

Afton Chemical produces fuel additives for gasoline and diesel vehicle performance, octane levels, home heating oil, and fuel specification and distribution.

Lubricant additives

Lubricant additives are organic and synthetic chemical components and the product segment includes couplers, dispersants and emulsifiers, friction modifiers, and tackiness additives.

Industrial additives

Afton Chemical acquired metalworking additives producer Polartech in 2010 to expand its industrial product base. Industrial products include lubricating grease additives, hydraulic lubricants and metalworking fluids.

Locations

Afton Chemical has regional offices located in Asia Pacific, Europe, India, the Middle East, Latin America and North America. The company has a technical center located in Ashland, Virginia. The Ashland Technical Center is the R&D site for vehicle-based research used by all strategic business units that manufacture automotive additives, including engine oil, fuel, transmission and axle. The center is used for research into durability, fuel economy, emissions, and new-product development. Plants are located in Belgium, England, India, Brazil, China, Mexico and throughout the United States. The company opened a research lab in Suzhou, China, in 2011 and in July 2012 announced the construction of a new chemical additive manufacturing plant in Jurong Island, Singapore, which became operational mid-2016.

== Industries ==
Afton Chemical operates within the petroleum industry, primarily focusing on, and manufacturing chemical additives for: driveline, engine oil, fuel, and industrial business units.

== History ==
1887 – Albemarle Paper Manufacturing is founded in Richmond, VA

1924 – General Motors Chemical Corporation, which introduced tetraethyllead as a fuel additive to reduce engine “knock,” is renamed as Ethyl Gasoline Corporation.

1962 – Albemarle Paper Co. acquires Ethyl Gasoline Corporation and adopts the Ethyl Corporation name.

1975 – Ethyl acquires Edwin Cooper, Inc.

1992 – Ethyl acquires Amoco Petroleum Additives in the U.S. and Nippon Cooper in Japan, as global consolidation comes to the petroleum industry.

1996 – Ethyl acquires Texaco Additives Company.

2004 - Ethyl Petroleum Additives, Inc. changes its name to Afton Chemical Corporation. It begins operating as a wholly owned subsidiary of NewMarket Corporation.

2008 – Afton Chemical acquires the North American fuel additives business of GE Water and Processing Technologies.

2009 – Afton Chemical expands investment in the Asia-Pacific region with facilities in Shanghai, China, Tsukuba, Japan and Jurong Island, Singapore.

2010 – Afton Chemical acquires PolarTech Metalworking and adds R&D and manufacturing facilities in the U.K., and manufacturing sites in India, China and the U.S.

2013 – Robert Shama replaces Warren Huang as president of Afton Chemical.

2013 – Afton Chemical announces expansion in Asia-Pacific with a new manufacturing facility on Jurong Island, Singapore.

2017 – Afton Chemical acquires Aditivos Mexicanos, S.A. de C.V. (AMSA), a petroleum additives manufacturing, sales and distribution company based in Mexico City, Mexico.

2018 – Gina Harm replaces Robert Shama as president of Afton Chemical Corporation.

— Afton Chemical Corporation, History
