= Ethyl Corporation =

Organization

- Founded: 1921
- Headquarters: 330 South 4th Street, Richmond, Virginia, United States of America
- Parent: NewMarket Corporation
- Website: ethyl.com

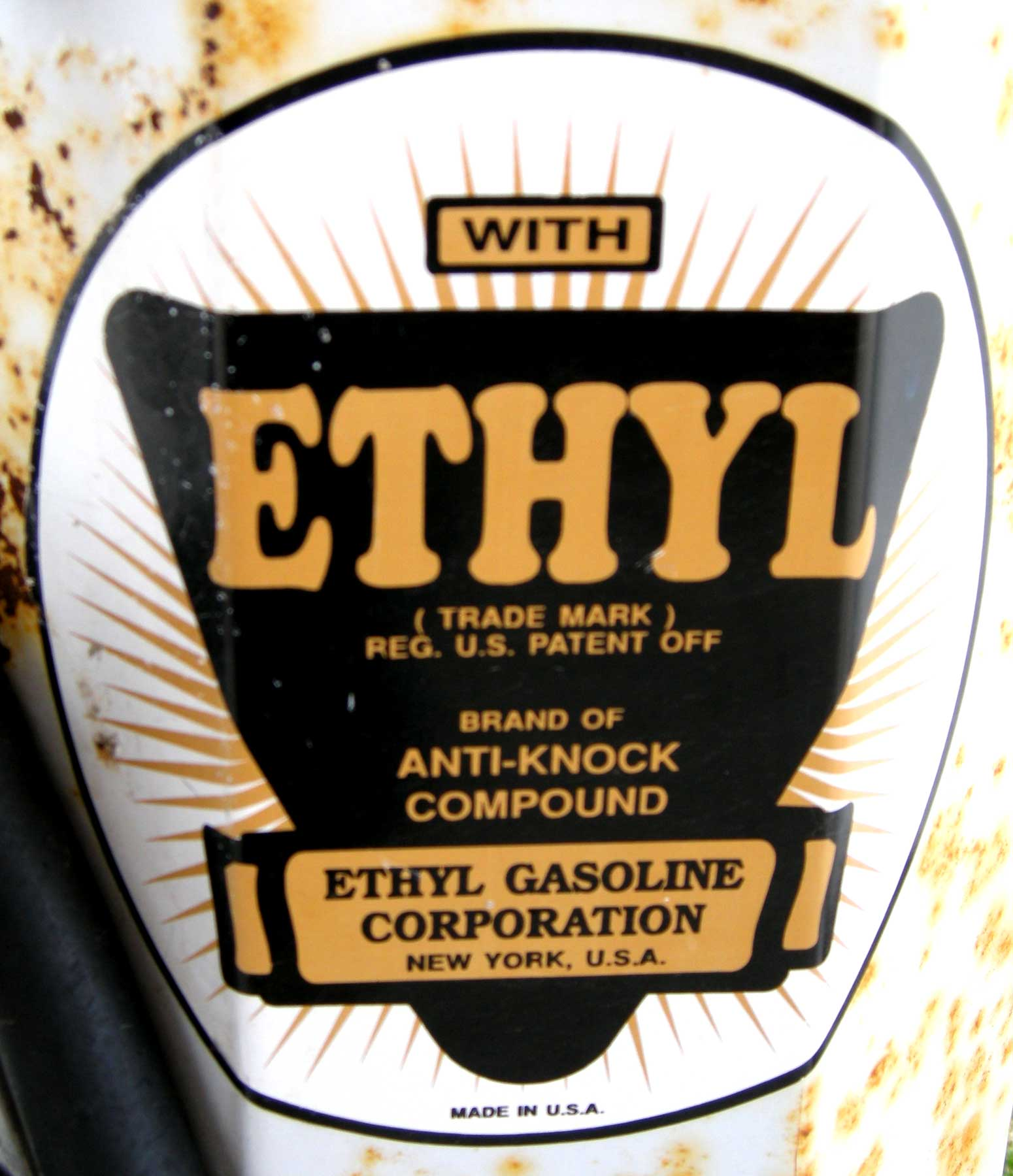
Sign advertising Ethyl additive, on an antique gasoline pump in the US

Ethyl Corporation is a fuel additive company headquartered in Richmond, Virginia, in the United States. The company is a distributor of fuel additives. Among other products, Ethyl Corporation distributes tetraethyl lead, an additive used to make leaded gasoline.

== History ==
Founded in 1923, Ethyl Corp was formed by General Motors and Standard Oil of New Jersey (Esso). General Motors had the "use patent" for tetraethyllead (TEL) as an antiknock fuel additive, based on the work of Thomas Midgley Jr., Charles Kettering, and later Charles Allen Thomas, and Esso had the patent for the manufacture of TEL. Since the patents affected the marketing of TEL, General Motors and ESSO formed Ethyl Corp; each parent company had a 50% stake in the new corporation. Since neither company had chemical plant experience, they hired Dupont to operate the manufacturing facilities. After patents ran out, Dupont started manufacture of TEL on their own, and Ethyl started running its own operations.

Logo from an old gasoline pump on Route 23, Leola, Pennsylvania

Within the first year of its operation, the company’s plants were plagued by cases of lead poisoning, hallucinations, insanity, and even the deaths of its employees due to exposure to lead. While the company tried to hush the news, at times it was impossible, for example in 1924, within the first two months of its operation, the facility had 17 cases of severe lead poisoning leading to hallucinations and insanity, then five production workers died in quick succession, and 35 more turned into staggering wrecks at one ill-ventilated facility.

To counter these accusations, Thomas Midgley Jr. participated in a press conference to demonstrate the apparent safety of TEL on October 30, 1924, in which he poured TEL over his hands, placed a bottle of the chemical under his nose, and inhaled its vapor for 60 seconds, declaring that he could do this every day without any problems. In fact, he knew the dangers of lead poisoning, having been made seriously ill from overexposure a few months earlier.

A 1954 short film commissioned by the Ethyl Corporation

The State of New Jersey ordered the TEL plant located at the Bayway Refinery in Linden NJ to be shut down a few days later, and Jersey Standard was forbidden to manufacture TEL again without state permission.

In 1962, Albemarle Paper Manufacturing Company, in Richmond, borrowed $200 million and purchased Ethyl Corporation (Delaware), a corporation 13 times its size. Albemarle then changed its name to Ethyl Corporation. It is believed that General Motors sought to divest itself of "Ethyl Corporation," owing to concern about liabilities of TEL. The 1962 transaction was the largest leveraged buyout at that time.

During the 1970s and 1980s, the Ethyl Corporation expanded and diversified in response to the gradual decline of the market for TEL, as the automotive industry shifted to unleaded gasoline in response to the recently passed Clean Air Act, which effectively ended the use of leaded gas in new automobiles. In the late 1980s, Ethyl began to spin off a number of divisions. The aluminum, plastics, and energy units became Tredegar Corporation in 1989. In 1993, it spun off its life insurance company, First Colony Life, and then in 1994, the specialty chemicals business was spun off as an independent, publicly traded company named Albemarle Corporation.

In 2004, Ethyl Corporation became a subsidiary of NewMarket Corporation (NYSE: NEU).

In 2022, the YouTube channel Veritasium released a video titled The Man Who Accidentally Killed the Most People in History, which examined Thomas Midgley Jr.'s role in the development of leaded gasoline and CFCs. The video, which had over 40 million views by 2025, brought renewed public attention to Ethyl Corporation’s historical involvement in leaded fuel production.

== Tetraethyllead ==
Tetraethyllead has been recognized as a contributor to soil, air and water lead pollution, and is toxic to humans. While leaded gasoline made engines more efficient, lead pollution has increased by over 625 times previous levels in the past century due partly to pollution by leaded fuel. Ethyl Corporation historically denied that tetraethyllead poses significant public health risks in excess of those associated with gasoline itself.

Tetraethyllead was supplied for blending with raw gasoline in the form of "Ethyl Fluid", which blended tetraethyllead with the lead scavengers 1,2-dibromoethane and 1,2-dichloroethane. Ethyl fluid contained a dye which would distinguish treated gasoline from untreated gasoline and discourage the diversion of gasoline for other purposes, such as cleaning.
