= Helia =

Austrial mortgage insurance company

- Type: Publicly listed company
- Industry: Insurance
- Predecessor: Genworth Mortgage Insurance Australia
- Headquarters: Sydney, Australia
- Key people: Ian McDonald, Chair; Pauline Blight-Johnson, CEO
- Products: Lenders mortgage insurance
- Website: www.helia.com.au

Helia is an Australian lenders mortgage insurance provider. It is listed on the ASX and changed its name from Genworth Mortgage Insurance Australia in October 2022.

In 2018, Helia invested in Tic:Toc, a mortgage fintech.

In 2021, Genworth Financial, an S&P400 insurance provider, sold its 52% of Helia's shares to institutional investors, effectively making Helia an independent company.

In 2022, Helia invested in OSQO a "deposit gap funder".

In 2022, Helia purchased 22% of Household Capital, a reverse mortgage provider.
