= Mortgage insurance =

Type of insurance policy

Mortgage insurance (also known as mortgage guarantee and home-loan insurance) is an insurance policy which compensates lenders or investors in mortgage-backed securities for losses due to the default of a mortgage loan. Mortgage insurance can be either public or private depending upon the insurer. The policy is also known as a mortgage indemnity guarantee (MIG), particularly in the UK.

== Australia ==
In Australia, borrowers must pay Lenders Mortgage Insurance (LMI) for home loans over 80% of the purchase price.

== Singapore ==
In Singapore, it is mandatory for owners of HDB flats to have a mortgage insurance if they are using the balance in their Central Provident Fund (CPF) accounts to pay for the monthly installment on their mortgage. However, they have the choice of selecting a mortgage insurance administered by the CPF Board or stipulated private insurers.

On the other hand, it is not mandatory for owners of private homes in Singapore to take a mortgage insurance.

== United States ==
=== Private mortgage insurance ===
Private mortgage insurance, or PMI, is typically required with most conventional (non government backed) mortgage programs when the down payment or equity position is less than 20% of the property value. In other words, when purchasing or refinancing a home with a conventional mortgage, if the loan-to-value (LTV) is greater than 80% (or equivalently, the equity position is less than 20%), the borrower will likely be required to carry private mortgage insurance.

PMI rates can range from 0.14% to 2.24% of the principal balance per year based on percent of the loan insured, LTV, a fixed or variable interest rate structure, and credit score. The rates may be paid in a single lump sum, annually, monthly, or in some combination of the two (split premiums). Most people pay PMI in 12 monthly installments as part of the mortgage payment.

In the United States, PMI payments by the borrower were tax-deductible until 2018.

==== Borrower paid private mortgage insurance ====
Borrower paid private mortgage insurance, or BPMI, is the most common type of PMI in today's mortgage lending marketplace. BPMI allows borrowers to obtain a mortgage without having to provide 20% down payment, by covering the lender for the added risk of a high loan-to-value (LTV) mortgage. The US Homeowners Protection Act of 1998 allows for borrowers to request PMI cancellation when the amount owed is reduced to 80% LTV. The Act requires cancellation of borrower-paid mortgage insurance when a certain date is reached. This date is when the loan is scheduled to reach 78% of the original appraised value or sales price is reached, whichever is less, based on the original amortization schedule for fixed-rate loans and the current amortization schedule for adjustable-rate mortgages. BPMI can, under certain circumstances, be cancelled earlier by the servicer ordering a new appraisal showing that the loan balance is less than 80% of the home's value due to appreciation. This generally requires at least two years of on-time payments. Each investor's LTV requirements for PMI cancellation differ based on the age of the loan and current or original occupancy of the home. While the Act applies only to single family primary residences at closing, the investors Fannie Mae and Freddie Mac allow mortgage servicers to follow the same rules for secondary residences. Investment properties typically require lower LTVs.

There is a growing trend for BPMI to be used with the Fannie Mae 3% downpayment program. In some cases, the Lender is giving the borrower a credit to cover the cost of BPMI.

==== Lender paid private mortgage insurance ====
Lender paid private mortgage insurance, or LPMI, is similar to BPMI except that it is paid by the lender and built into the interest rate of the mortgage. LPMI is usually a feature of loans that claim not to require Mortgage Insurance for high LTV loans. The advantage of LPMI is that the total monthly mortgage payment is often lower than a comparable loan with BPMI, but because it's built into the interest rate, a borrower can't get rid of it when the equity position reaches 22% without refinancing.

=== Contracts ===
As with other insurance, an insurance policy is part of the insurance transaction. In mortgage insurance, a master policy issued to a bank or other mortgage-holding entity (the policyholder) lays out the terms and conditions of the coverage under insurance certificates. The certificates document the particular characteristics and conditions of each individual loan. The master policy includes various conditions including exclusions (conditions for denying coverage), conditions for notification of loans in default, and claims settlement. The contractual provisions in the master policy have received increased scrutiny since the subprime mortgage crisis in the United States. Master policies generally require timely notice of default include provisions on monthly reports, time to file suit limitations, arbitration agreements, and exclusions for negligence, misrepresentation, and other conditions such as pre-existing environmental contaminants. The exclusions sometimes have "incontestability provisions" which limit the ability of the mortgage insurer to deny coverage for misrepresentations attributed to the policyholder if twelve consecutive payments are made, although these incontestability provisions generally don't apply to outright fraud.

Coverage can be rescinded if misrepresentation or fraud exists. In 2009, the United States District Court for the Central District of California determined that mortgage insurance could not be rescinded "poolwide".

=== History ===
Mortgage insurance began in the United States in the 1880s, and the first law on it was passed in New York in 1904. The industry grew in response to the 1920s real estate bubble and was "entirely bankrupted" after the Great Depression. By 1933, no private mortgage insurance companies existed. The bankruptcy was related to the industry's involvement in "mortgage pools", an early practice similar to mortgage securitization. The federal government began insuring mortgages in 1934 through the Federal Housing Administration and Veteran's Administration, but after the Great Depression no private mortgage insurance was authorized in the United States until 1956, when Wisconsin passed a law allowing the first post-Depression insurer, Mortgage Guaranty Insurance Corporation (MGIC), to be chartered. This was followed by a California law in 1961 which would become the standard for other states' mortgage insurance laws. Eventually the National Association of Insurance Commissioners created a model law.

Max H. Karl, a Milwaukee real estate attorney, invented the modern form of private mortgage insurance. In the 1950s, Karl became frustrated with the time and paperwork required to obtain a home backed by Federal Government insurance, the only kind available at the time. In 1957, using $250,000 raised from friends and other investors in his hometown of Milwaukee, Karl founded the Mortgage Guaranty Insurance Corporation. Unlike many mortgage insurers who collapsed during the Depression, MGIC would only insure the first 20 percent of loss on a defaulted mortgage, thus limiting its exposure and creating more incentives for savings and loan associations and other lenders to issue loans only to home buyers who could afford them. The guarantee was enough to encourage lenders across the country to issue mortgage loans to buyers whose down payments were less than 20 percent of the home's price. The availability of credit helped fuel the home building boom of the 1960s and 1970s. By the time of Karl's death in 1995, more than 12 percent of the nation's nearly $4 trillion in home mortgages had private mortgage insurance.

In 1999 the Homeowners Protection Act of 1998 came into effect as a federal law of the United States, which requires automatic termination of mortgage insurance in certain cases for homeowners when the loan-to-value on the home reaches 78%; prior to the law, homeowners had limited recourse to cancel and by one estimate, 250,000 homeowners were paying for unnecessary mortgage insurance. Similar state laws existed in eight states at the time of its passage; in 2000, a lawsuit by Eliot Spitzer resulted in refunds due to mortgage insurers lack of compliance with a 1984 New York state law which required insurers to stop charging homeowners after a certain point. These laws may continue to apply; for example, the New York law provides "broader protection".

For Federal Housing Administration-insured loans, the cancellation requirements may be more difficult.

== See also ==
- Payment protection insurance
- Lenders mortgage insurance
- Canada Mortgage and Housing Corporation
- Credit default swap
- FHA insured loan
- Home equity protection
