= Lenders mortgage insurance =

Private mortgage insurance

Lenders mortgage insurance (LMI), also known as private mortgage insurance (PMI) in the US, is a type of insurance payable to a lender or to a trustee for a pool of securities that may be required when taking out a mortgage loan. Its purpose is to offset losses in the case where a mortgagor is not able to repay the loan and the lender is not able to recover its costs after foreclosure and sale of the mortgaged property.

== Mortgage insurance in the US ==
The annual cost of PMI varies and is expressed in terms of the total loan value in most cases, depending on the loan term, loan type, proportion of the total home value that is financed, the coverage amount, and the frequency of premium payments (monthly, annual, or single). The PMI may be payable up front, or it may be capitalized onto the loan in the case of single premium product. This type of insurance is usually only required if the downpayment is 20% or less of the sales price or appraised value (in other words, if the loan-to-value ratio (LTV) is 80% or more). Once the principal is reduced to 80% of value, the PMI is often no longer required on conventional loans. This can occur via the principal being paid down, via home value appreciation, or both. FHA loans often require refinancing to remove PMI, even after the LTV drops below 80%. The effective interest savings from paying off PMI can be substantial. In the case of lender-paid MI, the term of the policy can vary based upon the type of coverage provided (either primary insurance, or some sort of pool insurance policy). Borrowers typically have no knowledge of any lender-paid MI, in fact most "No MI Required" loans actually have lender-paid MI, which is funded through a higher interest rate that the borrower pays.

Sometimes lenders will require that mortgage insurance be paid for a fixed period (for example, 2 or 3 years), even if the principal reaches 80% sooner than that. Legally, there is no obligation to allow the cancellation of MI until the loan has amortized to a 78% LTV ratio based on the original purchase price. The cancellation request must come from the servicer of the mortgage to the PMI company who issued the insurance. Often the servicer will require a new appraisal to determine the LTV.

If borrowers have less than the 20% downpayment needed to avoid a mortgage insurance requirement, they might be able to make use of a second mortgage (sometimes referred to as a "piggy-back loan") to make up the difference. Two popular versions of this lending technique are the so-called 80/10/10 and 80/15/5 arrangements. Both involve obtaining a primary mortgage for 80% LTV. An 80/10/10 program uses a 10% LTV second mortgage with a 10% downpayment, and an 80/15/5 program uses a 15% LTV second mortgage with a 5% downpayment. Other combinations of second mortgage and downpayment amounts might also be available. One advantage of using these arrangements is that under United States tax law, mortgage interest payments may be deductible on the borrower's income taxes, whereas mortgage insurance premiums were not until 2007. In some situations, the all-in cost of borrowing may be cheaper using a piggy-back than by going with a single loan that includes borrower-paid or lender-paid MI.

=== LMI/PMI tax deduction ===
Mortgage insurance became tax-deductible in 2007 in the US. For some homeowners, the new law made it cheaper to get mortgage insurance than to get a 'piggyback' loan. The MI tax deductibility provision passed in 2006 provides for an itemized deduction for the cost of private mortgage insurance for homeowners earning up to $109,000 annually.

The original law was extended in 2007 to provide for a three-year deduction, effective for mortgage contracts issued after December 31, 2006, and before January 1, 2010. It does not apply to mortgage insurance contracts that were in existence prior to passage of the legislation.

As of 2023, PMI was tax deductible for all years from 2007 until 2021. The IRS does not allow the PMI to be deducted for 2022.

== Mortgage insurance in Australia ==
The two main mortgage insurers in Australia are Helia and QBE LMI. Mortgage insurance is payable if the loan-to-value ratio (LTV, or LVR in Australia) is above 80%, or above 60% for low document loans. Some non-bank lenders obtain mortgage insurance for every loan irrespective of the LVR, however it is paid for by the lender if the loan is below 80% LVR.

LMI premiums are calculated using a sliding scale based on the loan amount and LVR. State government stamp duty may be payable on the premium. The premium is often capitalised on top of the loan amount. Unlike in other countries, the LMI premium is a one-off fee in Australia.

== Mortgage insurance in Canada ==
The Bank Act which governs banks as well as provincial laws governing credit unions and caisse populaires prohibit most regulated lending institutions from providing mortgages without insurance if the LTV is greater than 80%. The typical premium rates provided by Canada Mortgage and Housing Corporation are between 1% (for 80% LTV) and 2.75% (for 95% LTV) of the loan principal.

== See also ==
- Mortgage insurance
- Credit default swap
