= Shared appreciation mortgage =

A shared appreciation mortgage often abbreviated as "SAM" is a mortgage in which the purchaser of a home shared a percentage of the appreciation in the home's value with the lender. In return, the lender agrees to charge an interest rate that is lower than the prevailing market interest rate. The lender agrees to receive some or all of the repayment of the loan in the form of a share of the increase in value (the appreciation) of the property.

== In the UK ==
A shared appreciation mortgage is a mortgage arranged as a form of equity release. The lender loans the borrowers a capital sum in return for a share of the future increase in the value of the property. The borrowers retain the right to live in the property until death.

Shared appreciation mortgages sold between 1996–1998 have not always turned out to be products beneficial to the borrowers who took them out.

=== Sales and marketing ===
About 12,000 shared appreciation mortgages were sold by Bank of Scotland between November 1996 and March 1998 (17 months), and 3,253 were sold by Barclays Bank between May and July 1998 (3 months). They were sold by Bank of Scotland through financial advisers and mortgage brokers, and by Barclays directly to the borrowers. Barclays Bank loaned a total of £98m of shared appreciation mortgages, and so the average size of each of their loans would have been about £30,126.

Barclays' booklet on shared appreciation mortgages says that they were "specially designed for the needs and lifestyles of the mature homeowner... aged 45 or over and... property worth over £60,000." They were mostly aimed at people aged 65 and over, and marketed as ideal for people who had paid off their mortgage, allowing them to release cash tied up in their home without having to sell up.

In 2014, nearly half of the shared appreciation mortgages were still active.

=== The loan and the repayment ===
The lender of a shared appreciation mortgage lent a sum of money up to a maximum of 25% of the value of the property. The borrower retained ownership of the property and no repayments were made until the property was sold or the borrower died. At that time the repayment was the original amount borrowed plus a share of the increase in the value of the property. The lender's percentage share was three times the percentage of the value of the property that was originally borrowed. Therefore if the original loan was 25% of the value of the property, the share of the increase in the value would have been 75%. For the purpose of this calculation, the final value of the property was not the price at which the property was sold, but a valuation commissioned by the lender and paid for by the borrower. So if the property was sold for less than the valuation, the borrower's percentage share would be further reduced.

Barclays' booklet on shared appreciation mortgages gives an example of a property with an original valuation of £100,000 and a final valuation of £150,000. For a loan of £25,000, i.e. 25% of the original valuation, the repayment would be £25,000 + (75% × £50,000) = £62,500, i.e. 42% of the final valuation. Over a period of 20 years this would be equivalent to a compound interest rate of 4.7%.

However, the value of property has increased by a much greater amount than Barclays used in their example. The final valuation of the property in the example might now be £400,000. For a loan of £25,000, the repayment would be £25,000 + (75% × £300,000) = £250,000, i.e. 62.5% of the final valuation. Over a period of 20 years this would be equivalent to a compound interest rate of 12.2%, two and a half times the rate of the example. The borrower's share of the equity would be £150,000, less than half of the final valuation of the property of £400,000.

Bank of Scotland also sold shared-appreciation mortgages on which interest was charged at about 5.75% to 6% per annum. On these mortgages the maximum loan was 75% of the value of the property (compared with 25% for a zero-interest SAM), and the lender's percentage share of the appreciation was the same as the percentage ratio of the loan to the original value of the property (compared with three times the percentage for a zero-interest SAM). Therefore if the loan was 75% of the original value of the property, the lender's share of the appreciation would also have been 75%. The interest was paid by monthly instalments, and the final repayment was the original amount borrowed plus the lender's share of the appreciation.

The large repayment amount of a shared appreciation mortgage and the small share of the equity remaining mean that the borrower might not have sufficient money to be able to downsize to a smaller property. The borrower would have less money to pay care home fees, which would require the local authority to make a greater contribution to those fees. And the borrower would have less money to leave to his or her children or grandchildren, some of whom might have been looking after the borrower for many years.

Conversely, in the unlikely event that the value of property had remained the same or reduced, the shared appreciation mortgage would have effectively been interest-free.

=== Interest rate formula ===
To calculate the equivalent compound interest rate of a "zero-interest" shared-appreciation mortgage, i.e. the rate of the interest that would have been charged once a month on the amount owing, and added to the amount owing, so that at the end of the term of the loan, the amount owing would be the same as the repayment owing on a shared-appreciation mortgage:

$Equivalent \ compound \ interest \ rate = (\sqrt[12t] {\frac{R}{L}} - 1) \times 1200$

which is the same as:

$Equivalent \ compound \ interest \ rate = ((R/L)^{(1/12t)} - 1) \times 1200$

where R is the amount of the repayment, L is the amount of the loan, and t is the time in years (and part of a year) between the loan and the repayment. The formula gives the equivalent compound interest rate of the mortgage as a percentage.

Alternatively, if it was assumed that the interest would have been charged once a year on the amount owing, and added to the amount owing, the formula would be:

$Equivalent \ compound \ interest \ rate = (\sqrt[t] {\frac{R}{L}} - 1) \times 100$

which is the same as:

$Equivalent \ compound \ interest \ rate = ((R/L)^{(1/t)} - 1) \times 100$

For loans that were 25% of the value of the property, the repayment would normally be 75% of the difference between the initial and final values of the property, plus the amount of the initial loan.

=== The origin of shared appreciation mortgages ===
There is a detailed account of the origin of shared appreciation mortgages in chapter 23 of Dr Bettina von Stamm's book Managing Innovation, Design and Creativity, first edition published in 2003 and second edition published in 2008. Chapter 23 is titled "Innovation in Financial Services, Case Study 8: Shared Appreciation Mortgage – Bank of Scotland". This is a précis of the chapter:

==== The idea – rationale and getting buy-in ====
Craig Corn, a director in structured finance at Merrill Lynch, was looking for a way to give investors access to one of the largest asset pools, the housing market. This was dominated by owner-occupiers, most of whose wealth was tied up in their homes. Meanwhile, commercial investment in the much smaller private rental sector of the market was hampered by the cost of managing rental property and the difficulty of gaining repossession. Linking an investment to a mortgage would give investors access to the much larger owner-occupier sector of the housing market and enable the owner-occupiers to make financial use of their asset.

As Merrill Lynch's management did not feel that the product would fit into their existing product portfolio, Craig Corn approached other companies, and moved to the Swiss Bank Corporation (SBC). David Garner had joined SBC from a building society in Autumn 1995, and had knowledge of the UK mortgage and capital markets. Corn and Garner worked together on the project and obtained legal opinion. It soon emerged that homeowners could give up a share in the appreciation of their property in return for a fixed-term, low-interest mortgage, while investors could access the shared appreciation in return for their investment. (SBC bought S. G. Warburg & Co., a leading British investment banking firm, in 1995, and merged it with its own investment banking unit to create SBC Warburg.)

As well as having the support of SBC as an investment bank, Corn and Garner also needed a mortgage lender to market and manage the mortgages. Of the building societies and banks they approached, Bank of Scotland had a good reputation and were considered to be innovative. In February 1996, Craig Corn contacted Willie Donald, who had recently joined Bank of Scotland as Director of Sales. Willie Donald liked the idea and took it via George While, Head of Mortgages, to George Mitchell, Divisional Chief Executive of Personal Banking, both of whom also liked the idea. Mitchell put the idea to the main board, who approved it in principle in June 1996.

==== Getting started ====
SBC and Bank of Scotland quickly reached agreement to cooperate. George Mitchell selected Neil Forrest to work with Willie Donald on the product. Neil Forrest had been with the bank for seven or eight years and had expertise in securitization; Willie Donald had just introduced the Personal Choice Mortgage. According to Neil Forrest, Craig Corn and Willie Donald had the ideas while he and David Garner translated the ideas into something realizable.

The team spent four or five months working on the first version of the product, which did not involve securitization. This is the pooling of debt such as residential mortgages, and selling their cash flows as securities, also known as bonds. One reason that it had not initially been included was that it had a bad reputation: it was normally only used if direct financing could not be afforded. Another reason was that the proposed interest rate swaps would have been a substantial taxation risk for the bank. The second version of the product, which did involve securitization, was given the go-ahead.

The implementation team consisted of Willie Donald and Neil Forrest, responsible for the product, Ian Dickson and John Lloyd, for sales, John Trouten, for customer care, Dave Smith, for process area, and three people from systems. A second team was dedicated to develop the processes surrounding the shared appreciation mortgage. At the first implementation team meeting, on 25 September 1996, the launch date was set for 4 November 1996. Gary Gordon, Manager, Operations, joined the team in early October 1996.

==== Product and markets ====
The team focused on a choice for borrowers of two interest rates: a 0% mortgage where the borrower could borrow up to 25% of the value of property and give up appreciation worth three times the percentage borrowed, i.e. up to 75%, and a 5.75% mortgage where the borrower could borrow up to 75% of the value of property and give up appreciation at the same percentage as the percentage borrowed.

For the investor, the 5.75% SAMs would be securitized into fixed rate bonds with a fixed interest rate of about 55% of the 10-year gilt yield (a gilt is a UK government bond). The 0% SAMs would be securitized into floating rate bonds with a variable interest rate of about 60% of the three month Libor (London Inter-bank Offered Rate, an interest rate average calculated from estimates submitted by the leading banks in London). The interest would be paid quarterly, and would consist of the fixed or floating element plus an additional element from SAMs terminated in that quarter. The debt was amortized (reduced) each quarter as the number of homes with SAMs reduced. Therefore the ratio of the interest to the debt would gradually increase, and the benefit of this would compensate for the bonds not having a fixed term.

SAMs would be less risky for investment than equity (a share of ownership), they would be long term, and their earnings would be linked to house prices, which historically performed better than inflation but not as well as shares. Consequently, they were expected to appeal to pension funds, property funds and equity investors.

All of the debt and equity of the SAMs would go to the bondholders, with Bank of Scotland receiving a fee. Money from the mortgages coming into Bank of Scotland would be cleared monthly or weekly to SBC. To keep funds associated with SAMs separate from its other funds, Bank of Scotland set up an independent company for each SAM. BoS acted as an agent for each BoS SAM and legal charges were in the name of the BoS SAM rather than BoS. Separate companies had to be set up for interest-bearing and zero-interest Scottish SAMs: BoS SAM 3 and BoS SAM 4. One of the English companies securitized the assets.

==== Trials and tribulations ====
The implementation team attempted to anticipate any problems. At their second meeting in early October, they were alerted by the IT people to the fact that Unisys, one of the bank's IT systems, could only process loans of up to 50 years, whereas the SAM was open-ended, until the sale of the property or the death of the owner. Nor could Unisys process an interest rate of 0%. There was also concern that with a separate company for each SAM, overnight processing might overrun, especially at the end of the month. The processing capacity was therefore upgraded, with a separate system for mortgages to avoid affecting the other systems.

Property valuations were important because appreciation was calculated on the difference between the initial valuation and the final valuation of a property. Countrywide was appointed to administer the panel of valuers.

==== Market introduction and reaction ====
At the team meeting on 9 October 1996, it was decided to launch on 11 November, following an announcement in The Sunday Times on 4 November. There was also a press leak in a Sunday newspaper on 20 October. The product was launched before contracts with SBC Warburg had been finalised and before terms and conditions had been copy-written. By the launch date the bank was already receiving about 2,000 phone calls per day, with most of the callers interested in the 0% option, and 2,500 people had requested more information. Demand was much greater than expected: by the second week of December they had run out of brochures.

BoS SAM 1 and BoS SAM 2 were sold in England, with the first moneys drawn on 31 December 1996. For the BoS SAM 1, 5.75% option, bonds worth £27.2m were issued; for the BoS SAM 2, 0% option, bonds worth £105.6m were issued. Unexpectedly, investors did not include pension funds. Borrowers had been expected to be in their seventies, but most of them were in their fifties or sixties.

==== After the initial enthusiasm ====
SAMs 3 and 4, for Scotland, could not be launched until the securitization of SAMs 1 and 2 had been completed, and they were also delayed by the different legal system in Scotland. They were introduced in mid-February 1997 and took longer to place with investors than SAMs 1 and 2. During the preparations for SAMs 5 and 6, SBC Warburg merged with Union Bank of Switzerland. The merger was announced on 8 December 1997 and created UBS AG. Investors could not be found for SAMs 5 and 6, which had to be taken up by SBC Warburg itself. Bank of Scotland hoped that UBS/SBC Warburg would find new investors for the SAMs, but instead had to withdraw the product.

BoS SAMs 2, 4 and 6 were 0% interest mortgages, with the lender's percentage share of the appreciation being three times the percentage ratio of the loan to the initial value of the property (LTV).

==== Competitors' reaction ====
In March 1998, after Bank of Scotland had withdrawn their product, Barclays Bank launched their shared appreciation mortgage. Like Bank of Scotland's zero-interest mortgage, the maximum loan to property value ratio (LTV) was 25%, no interest was charged, and the lender's share of the appreciation was three times the LTV. Barclays sold 3,253 SAMs between May and July 1998. Barclays Capital securitized the mortgages in 1999 through Millshaw SAMS No 1 Ltd, a £98m triple-A rated zero coupon bond, which was a 55-year deal. The take-up by investors was slow, but institutions bought the bonds for their high returns.

On 11 July 1998 the Financial Times reported that shared appreciation mortgages were temporarily off the market after demand from borrowers had exceeded the supply of money from the bonds market. £750m worth of bonds had been sold by Bank of Scotland and £98m by Barclays Bank. Shared appreciation mortgages did not subsequently return to the market.

When house prices increased and the appreciation became much greater than the initial value of the properties, the borrowers owed the investors the majority of the value of their properties and were left with only a small proportion of the value for themselves.

=== Millennium Product ===
The Bank of Scotland shared-appreciation mortgage was selected as one of 1,012 Millennium Products by the Design Council. The Millennium Product concept was launched by Prime Minister Tony Blair in September 1997 and the full and final list was unveiled by him in December 1999. He hailed the Millennium Products companies as "the very best of British innovation, creativity and design." The Bank of Scotland shared-appreciation mortgage was described by the Design Council as "A mortgage which allows you to release cash tied up in your house for 0% interest payments, in return for a share in any appreciation in value from the sale of the home." The description does not state the size of the share in the appreciation in the value of the home. By the time the final list of Millennium Products was announced in December 1999, shared-appreciation mortgages were no longer being offered for sale by either Bank of Scotland or Barclays Bank.

=== SAM products and companies ===
Shared-appreciation mortgage products
Name	Interest rate	Fixed/ variable	Appreciation share : loan	Sold in	Issued
BoS SAM 1	5.75%	Fixed	1:1	England and Wales	11 November 1996
BoS SAM 2	0%		3:1	England and Wales	11 November 1996
BoS SAM 3	5.95%	Variable	1:1	Scotland	mid-February 1997
BoS SAM 4	0%		3:1	Scotland	mid-February 1997
BoS SAM 5	5.99%	Variable	1:1	England and Wales	1997/98
BoS SAM 6	0%		3:1	England and Wales	1997/98
Barclays	0%		3:1	England and Wales	March 1998

"Appreciation share : loan" is the ratio of the lender's percentage share of the appreciation
to the percentage of the initial value of the property that was borrowed.

Shared appreciation mortgage companies
Incorporated	Company number	From	To	Name	Status	SIC
05/10/1995	03110558	05/10/1995	26/04/1996	REFAL 474 Limited	Renamed	
		26/04/1996	01/11/1996	BoS (Shared Appreciation Mortgages) Limited	Renamed	
		01/11/1996		BoS (Shared Appreciation Mortgages) No. 1 PLC	Active	64921
23/01/1996	03149607	23/01/1996	11/10/1996	REFAL 485 Limited	Renamed	
		11/10/1996		BoS (Shared Appreciation Mortgages) No. 2 PLC	Active	64921
20/11/1996	03281120	20/11/1996		BoS (Shared Appreciation Mortgages (Scotland)) Limited	Active	99999
12/03/1997	03331868	12/03/1997	28/04/1997	REFAL 507 Limited	Renamed	
		28/04/1997	09/02/1998	BoS (Shared Appreciation Mortgages (Scotland) No. 2) Ltd	Renamed	
		09/02/1998		BoS (Shared Appreciation Mortgages (Scotland) No. 2) Limited	Active	99999
12/03/1997	03331871	12/03/1997	17/04/1997	REFAL 506 Limited	Renamed	
		17/04/1997		BoS (Shared Appreciation Mortgages) No. 3 PLC	Active	64921
12/03/1997	03331873	12/03/1997	17/04/1997	REFAL 505 Limited	Renamed	
		17/04/1997		BoS (Shared Appreciation Mortgages) No. 4 PLC	Active	64921
18/09/1997	03436151	18/09/1997	24/10/1997	REFAL 513 Limited	Renamed	
		24/10/1997	09/02/1998	BoS (Shared Appreciation Mortgages (Scotland) No. 3) Ltd	Renamed	
		09/02/1998		BoS (Shared Appreciation Mortgages (Scotland) No. 3) Limited	Active	64921
24/10/1997	03457750	24/10/1997		BoS (Shared Appreciation Mortgages) No. 5 PLC	Active	64921
24/10/1997	03457742	24/10/1997		BoS (Shared Appreciation Mortgages) No. 6 PLC	Active	64921
22/10/1990	02550646	22/10/1990	20/10/1993	BARSHELFCO (No. 41) Limited	Renamed	
		20/10/1993	20/01/1998	The Mortgage House Limited	Renamed	
		20/01/1998	11/05/1998	BARSHELFCO (TR No. 2) Limited	Renamed	
		11/05/1998		Barclays SAMS Limited	Active	74990

SIC (nature of business, Standard Industrial Classification of Economic Activities)
64921	Credit granting by non-deposit taking finance houses and other specialist consumer credit grantors
74990	Non-trading company
99999	Dormant company

Bank of Scotland PLC and the nine BoS (Shared Appreciation Mortgages) companies are subsidiaries of Lloyds Banking Group PLC. Bank of Scotland merged with Halifax in 2001 to form HBOS (Halifax Bank of Scotland). Lloyds TSB Group negotiated a takeover of HBOS in 2008 and changed its name to Lloyds Banking Group on completion of the takeover in 2009.

=== Bank of Scotland ("as agent for BOS (SAM) No. 4 PLC") shared appreciation mortgage sales booklet ===
On page 10 of the BoS SAM No. 4 PLC sales booklet, there is an example of a shared appreciation mortgage based on a loan of £30,000, an initial house value of £120,000, repayment of the mortgage after 20 years, and fees totalling £1,890, and assuming average house price inflation of 4.5% per annum. The APR (annual percentage rate) of this mortgage is 8.7%. The quoted repayment, including the initial loan (£30,000), the shared appreciation (£127,054), the arrangement fee (£500), the legal fees (£600), the valuation fees on entry and exit (£490), and an administration fee (£300), is £158,944.

On page 5 of the same document there is another example of a shared appreciation mortgage. This is based on a loan of £20,000, an initial property value ("base value") of £100,000 and a final property value ("exit value") of £150,000. The quoted repayment, including the initial loan (£20,000) and the shared appreciation (£30,000), but not including the exit valuation fee or the administration fee (£300), is £50,000. This repayment is much less than the repayments that are having to be made on actual mortgages. The example does not give the number of years of the mortgage, but if it is assumed to be 20 years, as in the example on page 10, the average house price inflation of the example is 2.0% and the APR is 4.7%. This example therefore assumes different average house price inflation from the example on page 10. The BoS SAM No. 6 PLC sales booklet is very similar to the BoS SAM No. 4 PLC sales booklet, but most of the example on page 5 has been removed.

=== Barclays Bank shared appreciation mortgages sales booklet ===
On page 5 of the Barclays Bank shared appreciation mortgages sales booklet there are three examples of shared appreciation mortgages. They are based on loans of £15,000, £20,000 and £25,000, an original property valuation of £100,000 and a final property valuation of £150,000. The quoted repayments, including the initial loan and the shared appreciation, but not including any legal fees or other costs, are £37,500, £50,000 and £62,500. These repayments are much less than the repayments that are actually being made.The examples do not give the number of years of the mortgage, but if it is assumed to be 20 years, the average house price inflation of the examples is 2.0% and the APR is 4.7%.

=== Barclays SAMS Limited agreement ===
The agreement between Barclays SAMS Limited (the "Lender") and the "Borrower" states that it is a credit agreement regulated by the Consumer Credit Act 1974.

The agreement gives an example of a shared appreciation mortgage, based on a total loan of £20,000, an original property valuation of £120,000, property valuation before redemption of £140,000, and repayment of the loan after just two years. The total loan is 16.6% of the original property valuation and the repayment would be (3 × 16.6% × £20,000) + £20,000 = £29,960 (Barclays' figures), i.e. 21.4% of the final valuation. The average house price inflation is 8.0% and the APR is 22.4%. The percentage ratio of the loan to the final valuation, the average house price inflation, and the APR are distorted by the unrealistically short two-year term of the loan. The repayment of £29,960 is much lower than the repayments that are actually being made.

Barclays used a checklist titled "Barclays Mortgage Service" when they were discussing a mortgage with prospective borrowers. "Y/N" was printed against 18 statements for "Y" or "N" to be circled by hand as appropriate. None of the statements included any recommendation to seek legal or other independent advice, or any recommendation to discuss the mortgage with their family.

=== UK House Price Index ===
In the 20 years before Bank of Scotland started selling Shared Appreciation Mortgages in November 1996, the UK House Price Index increased from £10,682 in October 1976 to £59,885 in October 1996, an increase of 460% (£49,203) and average house price inflation of 9.0% per annum. In the 20 years before Barclays Bank started selling Shared Appreciation Mortgages in May 1998, the UK House Price Index increased from £12,429 in April 1978 to £69,757 in April 1998, an increase of 461% (£57,328) and average house price inflation of 9.0% per annum.

It would have been reasonable to expect the value of property to continue to increase at a high rate. However Shared Appreciation Mortgages were marketed before the widespread use of the internet. Potential customers and their solicitors would not have had easy access to UK House Price Index information, but banks selling mortgages would have had this information.

=== Regulation ===
In the 1990s, mortgages were not fully regulated. Banks operated voluntarily under the Banking Code, and mortgage lenders operated voluntarily under the Mortgage Lenders Code. As a condition of operating under the Banking Code, banks had to sign up to the Financial Ombudsman Service, which has legal powers to put things right if customers have been treated unfairly.

Although Barclays Bank and the Bank of Scotland marketed Shared Appreciation Mortgages under their company branding, they set up separate companies to administer and issue the mortgages. These separate companies were not signatories to the Banking Code, and so the Financial Ombudsman Service was not able to investigate customers' complaints about Shared Appreciation Mortgages.

However Barclays' booklet on shared appreciation mortgages says on the back cover, under the heading "The Mortgage Code and the Banking Code", "Barclays is committed to the Mortgage Code and the Banking Code, both of which set out the commitments and standards of banks in dealing with their customers. As such, we ensure that our products and services comply with the terms of both Codes. The Mortgage Code relates specifically to the service we provide, the provision of information regarding our mortgage products and services and how they operate."

The Mortgage Code came into effect on 1 July 1997 for lenders and on 30 April 1998 for mortgage intermediaries. It remained in force until 31 October 2004, when the Financial Services Authority's Mortgage Conduct of Business Sourcebook (MCOB) came into force. The standards of the Code are encompassed in ten key commitments, which include helping customers to understand the financial implications of a mortgage.

The Financial Services Authority (FSA) did not start to regulate mortgage business until 31 October 2004. The FSA was replaced by the Financial Conduct Authority (FCA) on 1 April 2013.

=== Legislation ===
The Consumer Credit Act 1974 significantly reformed the law relating to consumer credit.

The Consumer Credit Act 2006 extended the scope of the Consumer Credit Act 1974, created the Financial Ombudsman scheme, and increased the powers of the Office of Fair Trading. It permits borrowers to challenge unfair debtor-creditor relationships in court. Some shared appreciation mortgage customers and their families consider that the arrangement whereby a loan which is 25% of the initial value of a property is repaid by 75% of the appreciation in the value of the property, plus the amount of the loan, could be an unfair debtor-creditor relationship.

The Unfair Terms in Consumer Contracts Regulations 1999, Regulation 7, states that a seller or supplier shall ensure that any written term of a contract is expressed in plain, intelligible language and that if there is doubt about the meaning of a written term, the interpretation which is most favourable to the consumer shall prevail. Regulation 8 provides that an unfair term "shall not be binding upon the consumer", where an unfair term is one which causes a significant imbalance in the parties' rights and obligations arising under the contract, to the detriment of the consumer.

=== Early dissension ===
In October 1997 Harold Fisher and his wife borrowed £90,000 from Bank of Scotland under its Shared Appreciation Mortgage Scheme. By year three of the loan, Mr Fisher realised that the large increase in house prices meant that their debt to Bank of Scotland had increased by a much greater amount than he had expected. He wrote to the bank to express his fears but they said he had signed the contract.

Mr Fisher then took his claim to the Financial Ombudsman Service, which ruled against him. They said that in shared appreciation mortgage disputes, they usually ruled in favour of the banks.

Another couple who borrowed money from Bank of Scotland under its Shared Appreciation Mortgage Scheme, £72,000, were Geoffrey Cooke and his wife. Mr Cooke was planning to make an application to the High Court in September 2003 to have their mortgage contract dealt with under the Unfair Terms in Consumer Contracts Regulations 1994 (and amendments). He thought there was evidence that the entry and exit procedures from the loan breached statute law and European Union law.

After The Times reported on Geoffrey Cooke's case in August 2003, they said they were inundated with letters, telephone calls and e-mails from readers who similarly ended up facing crippling debts.

=== Shared Appreciation Mortgage Victims Action Group (SAMVIC) ===
As the Financial Ombudsman Service was ineffective, shared-appreciation mortgage customers contacted their Members of Parliament and in 2003 created the Shared Appreciation Mortgage Victims Action Group (SAMVIC), a body of 500 homeowners who felt that they had been deceived by lenders into taking on debts that were now exorbitant, to coordinate legal action against the banks.

=== Parliament ===
The House of Commons Standard Note SN/BT/3414 "Shared Appreciation Mortgages", written by Timothy Edmonds and last updated on 12 December 2013, says, "There have been a significant number of debates in the House about equity release mortgages in general and SAMS in particular, as the consequences of policies taken out some years ago now come to be appreciated."

A pensions Green Paper, "Simplicity, Security and Choice: Working and Saving for Retirement", was published in December 2002. It stated that the Treasury would be "looking at options to create a level playing field for the regulation of equity release and home reversion plans to protect consumers and make the market work better".

There was a general debate on 14 January 2003 in an adjournment debate in Westminster Hall launched by Angela Browning. During the debate, a number of members specifically mentioned shared-appreciation mortgages, including Vince Cable, Stephen O'Brien and the then Financial Secretary to the Treasury, Ruth Kelly.

During her speech, Ruth Kelly said, "I am pleased to say that, when the FSA's mortgage regulation comes into force, the proposed advice and disclosure regime will enable borrowers to become fully aware of the implications of all equity release loans before they take a decision on the right one for them... In the meantime, if Hon. Members' constituents believe that they have been badly advised, or that their mortgage was missold, and, assuming that all internal complaints procedures have been completed, they may be able to seek redress from the Financial Ombudsman Service."

In June 2003 the then Chief Secretary to the Treasury, Paul Boateng, initiated a consultation and in the following month he announced in response to oral questions, "All mortgage-based equity release schemes will be regulated by the Financial Services Authority with effect from 31 October 2004."

He also said, "... he is right to point out that a mortgage is one of the biggest financial decisions that a consumer makes. Equity release falls into that category too. They are very significant financial decisions. It is absolutely essential to protect consumers adequately. Indeed, I should point out that the FSA is the only statutory regulator in the world, as far as we are aware, that has consumer protection as one of its statutory objectives. As he knows, there will be better protection for consumers when the regulation of mortgages and mortgage advice comes into force on 31 October 2004. The new regime will give the borrower greater confidence in the decisions that he or she is making."

During a further debate held in December 2003 in Westminster Hall, the Financial Secretary said, "... the FSA will regulate the selling of mortgages by first legal charges on UK property where at least 40% is residential accommodation to be occupied by the borrower or their immediate family. That definition was derived following consultation and is designed to protect loans when a person's home may be at risk as a result of being sold an unsuitable product."

The outcome of the consultation initiated by the then Chief Secretary to the Treasury, Paul Boateng, was announced by the then Financial Secretary, Ruth Kelly, on 10 May 2004. It was that Home Reversion plans would be regulated by the FSA. Under Home Reversion plans, part of the house is sold to the lender and part of the ownership of the property passes to the lender, whereas under Shared Appreciation Mortgages, full ownership is retained by the borrower.

=== Hardship scheme ===
In June 2007 Barclays launched the Barclays Shared Appreciation Mortgage (SAM) Hardship Scheme. According to Barclays, it was designed to assist customers who were in a situation of substantial hardship due to a change in circumstances, and needed either to move to a more suitable property or to adapt their existing home to make it suitable to their needs, but were unable to do so due to their shared appreciation mortgage. It was aimed to help customers who were genuinely facing hardship and therefore not everyone would be eligible.

The Barclays Hardship Scheme would provide an interest-free loan to make up the difference between the amount of money the borrower would have after selling his or her existing home, and the amount of money the borrower would need to buy a new home, up to 50% of the value of the new home. The loan would be repayable on the sale of the new home, which would probably be on the death of the borrower.

The Bank of Scotland did not set up a formal hardship scheme, but said they would look at each individual case on application.

=== Class actions ===
The Shared Appreciation Mortgage Action Group (SAMAG) was set up in 2009 by Hilary Messer, who was then head of litigation at RWP Solicitors (Richard Wilson Pangbourne), based in Reading, Berkshire. Over 300 shared-appreciation mortgage customers paid £5,000 each, a total of £1.5m, towards legal fees for a class action. Hilary Messer said that recent changes to the Consumer Credit Act made it possible to sue the banks over the mortgages. Under the act, the changes to which were retrospective, if a court determined that the relationship between a creditor and a debtor was unfair to the debtor, it had wide powers to vary the terms of the loan agreement. A legal Letter Before Action was sent to the banks in January 2009. A group litigation order (GLO) was sought at a hearing on 14 July 2009 and it was made in the High Court on 5 October 2009, enabling the shared-appreciation mortgage customers to take legal action as a group against the banks.

The banks appealed against the decision that allowed the case to be heard and, with a different judge, won their appeal. The customers' solicitors needed more money, which the customers did not have, and so they had to withdraw their case. The customers then became liable for the banks' costs.

The banks agreed to waive their costs if the customers made legal agreements ("gagging orders") not to make any further complaints about their shared appreciation mortgages. The Shared Appreciation Mortgage Action Group (SAMAG) was dissolved and became part of the wider Struggle Against Financial Exploitation (SAFE) action group.

The solicitors Teacher Stern started claims in 2014 against Bank of Scotland and Barclays Bank for compensation relating to shared-appreciation mortgages that were sold between 1996 and 1998.

In June 2021 the solicitors Teacher Stern announced that they had successfully negotiated a settlement with Barclays Bank on behalf of 37 clients who took out shared-appreciation mortgages in the late 1990s. The details of the settlement are confidential.

Teacher Stern LLP represented 160 Shared Appreciation Mortgage Claimants in a case against the Bank of Scotland (part of the Lloyds Banking Group), with a trial that was due to start on 31 January 2024. On the day before the trial was due to start, Teacher Stern posted an agreed statement on their website, saying that the Claimants and Bank of Scotland (and the other Defendants) had agreed a commercial settlement, without any admission of liability, in the County Court action. It said that the terms of the settlement agreement are confidential, and that there are no changes to the mortgages, or their terms and conditions.

More claims against Barclays and Bank of Scotland were being planned from 2023 by Teacher Stern LLP, Trowers and Hamlins LLP, Clarke Willmott LLP and Acuity Law LLP, except that Clarke Willmott will not be making claims against Bank of Scotland. Clarke Willmott and Acuity Law might offer clients a no win no fee arrangement.

Some of the Bank of Scotland shared appreciation mortgages sold between 1996 and 1998 had agreements which were "governed and interpreted in accordance with Scots law." At present, English solicitors are not prepared to make group claims on behalf of customers of Scottish shared appreciation mortgages or their families. When more people have joined the "Scottish SAM" Facebook group, it should be possible for a group claim to be made on their behalf, probably by Scottish solicitors.

=== Media coverage ===
As well as many reports concerning shared appreciation mortgages in the national newspapers, there were reports in the August 2003 edition of Which?, the magazine of the Consumers' Association, and in the September 2006 and August 2007 editions of Saga Magazine.

A BBC Inside Out South investigation into shared-appreciation mortgages, presented by Nick Wallis, was broadcast on BBC One on 8 September 2014. One of the people interviewed on the programme by Wallis was Dr Julian Lewis, Member of Parliament for New Forest East in Hampshire.

Christopher Philpot, Senior Associate in Teacher Stern's dispute resolution department, was interviewed on the BBC's The One Show on 3 April 2017 in relation to the claim being organised against the Bank of Scotland and Barclays. There were also reports concerning shared-appreciation mortgages on the BBC Radio 4 Money Box programme on 27 September 2008, 22 April 2017 and 23 September 2017.

There was an article written by Ali Hussain about shared appreciation mortgages and published in The Sunday Times on 26 September 2021. It said that there would be a preliminary hearing at the High Court in October 2021 for litigation brought by Teacher Stern, representing 150 Bank of Scotland SAM customers. The action alleges that SAMs were 'fundamentally unsuitable' for consumers and 'inherently unfair' under the Consumer Credit Act 1974. The lead lawyer was David Bowman.

On 4 February 2024 The Sunday Times published an article written by Ali Hussain: "Victory for families whose unfair loans cost them their homes". It says that the Bank of Scotland has backed down at the last minute from defending its sale of an "unfair"equity release scheme (shared appreciation mortgages) in court.

== In the US ==
=== In commercial mortgages ===
A shared appreciation mortgage is a mortgage in which the lender agrees to an interest rate lower than the prevailing market rate, in exchange for a share of the appreciated value of the collateral property. The share of the appreciated value is known as the contingent interest, which is determined and due at the sale of the property or at the termination of the mortgage.

For instance, suppose the current prevailing interest rate is 6%, and the property was purchased for $500,000. The borrower puts down $100,000 and takes out a mortgage of $400,000 amortized over 30 years. The lender and the borrower agree to a lower interest rate of 5%, and to a contingent interest of 20% of appreciated value of the property. Because of the lower interest rate, the monthly payment is reduced from $2,398 to $2,147. However, this saving in monthly payments comes with a trade-off. Suppose the property is later sold for $700,000. Because of the agreement on the contingent interest, the borrower must pay the lender 20% of the profit, namely, $40,000.

By participating in the appreciation of the property, the lender takes an additional risk that is related to its value. Hence, whether this is a favorable trade-off depends on the conditions of the housing market. A shared appreciation mortgage differs from an equity-sharing agreement in that the principal of the loan is an unconditional obligation (to the extent collateralized by the property). Thus, if the property's value decreases, the borrower would still owe whatever principal is outstanding, and if the borrower sells the property for a loss, the contingent interest is simply zero.

Revenue Ruling 83-51 (1983) of the Internal Revenue Service specifies conditions under which the contingent interest in a shared appreciation mortgage may be considered tax-deductible mortgage interest. In particular, a shared appreciation mortgage must stipulate an unconditional obligation of payment of principal to avoid being recharacterized as an equity-sharing agreement, which may lead to different tax consequences. Because of the complexity of tax laws and terms tailored for individual situations, private, noncommercial mortgages involving shared appreciation should always be executed with the counsel of a real estate attorney.

=== In affordable housing (subsidized home ownership) ===
Shared appreciation clauses are also used by non-profits and local governmental agencies. These shared appreciation loans are structured as second mortgages, but are considered "silent" in that borrowers make no payments until they sell the home (or, in some cases, refinance the first mortgage). At the time of sale or refinance, the family is required to repay the full amount of the loan plus a portion of the home price appreciation. In this way, the amount returned to the subsidizing entity is based on increases in home prices, which helps to preserve the "buying power" of public subsidies.

One common approach to designing shared appreciation loan programs is to base the share of appreciation payable upon sale of the home on the share of the original purchase price that was subsidized.

For example, if a family received a $50,000 subsidy to buy a $250,000 home, the family would be required to give the community 20 percent ($50,000 divided by $250,000) of any home price appreciation at the time of sale, in addition to repaying the initial $50,000.

Additional limitations on the shared appreciation can be placed, such as a usury limitation of a maximum of 6% effective interest on the money lent, as is the case in the down payment assistance offered by the City of Seattle.
