= Home equity investments =

Financial products

Home equity investments (HEI) are financial products that allow homeowners to access their home equity as a lump sum without incurring monthly payments. They first emerged around 2015 and function by enabling investors to purchase a minority stake in a homeowner's property for a predetermined duration. In return, investors receive either a percentage of the home's future market value or a specified share of its appreciation.

HEIs typically do not require monthly repayments; instead, homeowners repay investors either at the end of the agreed term or upon selling the property. Investors share in both the appreciation and depreciation of the home's value, thereby creating a downside-protected asset.

== Structure ==
HEI pricing structures generally follow one of two models:

- Share of Home Value Model: Investors receive a percentage of the home's value at the contract's end, which may be greater or less than the initial investment, depending on market conditions.
- Share of Home Appreciation Model: Investors receive the original investment amount plus a specified percentage of the home's appreciated value.

Companies currently offering HEIs in the United States include Hometap, Point, Unlock, Splitero, and Aspire. Qualification criteria vary but typically require homeowners to have at least 20-25% equity in their homes. Additional eligibility factors include credit score, debt-to-income ratio, and home value. Investment amounts usually range between $15,000 and $600,000, and are capped at approximately 25% of the home's market value.

== Applications ==
Home equity investments serve as alternatives to traditional financial instruments such as cash-out refinancing, reverse mortgages, and small business loans. Generally, these investments do not impose restrictions on the use of funds and attracting homeowners seeking flexibility.

== Developments and regulation ==
Home equity investment products have gained increased attention from both financial markets and regulators due to their growing popularity acceptance as an asset class alternative to home equity loans and HELOCs. This includes being securitized for investment from institutional capital. Other developments include enhanced transparency tools for homeowners, such as equity dashboards, and greater scrutiny from regulators monitoring these financial products' rapid expansion. HEI companies have been criticized for potential risks and downsides, including uncertain future obligations and possible reduced equity for homeowners.
