= Cash out refinancing =

Type of loan

Cash out refinancing (in the case of real property) occurs when a loan is taken out on property already owned in an amount above the cost of transaction, payoff of existing liens, and related expenses. Strictly speaking, all refinancing of debt is "cash-out," when funds retrieved are utilized for anything other than repaying an existing loan.

In the common usage of the term, cash out refinancing occurs when equity is liquidated from a property above and beyond sum of the payoff of existing loans held in lien on the property. This is often done when the value of the property has increased allowing the mortgagor to increase their mortgage taking cash out to spend on other things.

== Etymology ==
The compound noun "refinancing" is composed of the Latin prefix "re" (back, again but also against, against) and the word stem "financing" (Latin financia, "payment") and is a deverbal derivative.

== Money creation by commercial banks ==
When granting loans or purchasing assets on the asset side of their balance sheets, commercial banks generate book money in the form of demand deposits in checking accounts for their customers on the liability side (see money creation). Through giro transfers by customers of these funds to other banks, through withdrawals, and through transactions by the bank itself, these liabilities of the bank change into other forms, such as time and savings deposits as well as debt securities (savings bonds), interbank loans, or liabilities to the central bank. In addition, banks must meet minimum reserve requirements and minimum capital requirements for credit risk under Basel III.

In the broadest sense, a bank refers to the risk-adjusted management of all balance sheet items that have arisen in return for lending business as refinancing. In this context, demand deposits are included among the sources of funding. In the narrowest sense, on the other hand, the Deutsche Bundesbank defines refinancing simply as the procurement of central bank money by commercial banks.

In banking, refinancing is only used for cash loans. This is not the case, however, for credit transactions in the context of lending (guarantee credits such as sureties).

== Example ==
A homeowner who owes $80,000 on a home valued at $200,000 has $120,000 in equity. This equity can be liquidated with a cash-out refinance loan providing the loan is larger than $80,000.

The total amount of equity that can be withdrawn with a cash-out refinance is dependent on the mortgage lender, the cash-out refinance program, and other relative factors, such as the value of the home.

== Compared to a home equity loan ==
The difference between cashout refinancing and a home equity loan are as follows:

- A home equity loan is a separate loan on top of a first mortgage.
- A cash-out refinance is a replacement of a first mortgage.
- The interest rates on a cash-out refinancing are usually, but not always, lower than the interest rate on a home equity loan.
- The borrower pays the mortgage refinance closing costs.
- Generally, the borrower does not pay closing costs for a home equity loan.
- Closing costs can amount to hundreds or thousands of dollars.

=== Related topics ===
The opposite, "rate-and-term" refinancing, occurs when a better note rate, better loan terms, or both become available to an owner which restructures their debt portfolio as it relates to liens held against a subject property. Consolidating multiple loans into one loan without extracting cash is also a rate-and-term.

Loan-to-value limits, and other factors in loan approval determine how much cash can be taken out from the equity of any one property.

== See also ==
- Debit card cashback
- Equity release
- Inflation
- Mortgage cashback
- California Proposition 13 (1978), U.S.
- Real-estate bubble
- Reverse mortgage
