= Seller's points =

Seller's Points (or seller contributions) are lump sum payments (or finance charges) made by the seller to the buyer's lender to reduce the cost of the loan to the buyer.

One point is equal to 1% of the loan amount. The payment can either be required by the lender or volunteered by the seller. Typically, this situation takes place when the seller is in a rush to sell the property or has had issues finding a buyer. These costs are non-recurring closing costs that are also tax breaks for the buyers.

== Benefits and Uses ==
=== Benefits ===
Buyers can use seller's points to pay for prepaid costs, mortgage interest or temporary rate buydowns. This means that if you have money in savings that you must retain, you could ask the seller to pay for a 1 to 2 percent interest rate reduction for a year or prepay your interest, homeowner’s association fees or homeowner’s insurance for a set period. That would give you time to replenish your savings account for the money you used at closing and maintain your 3.5 percent equity investment in the property.

=== Uses ===
If a buyer is planning to use savings to pay for closing costs, discount points or rate buydowns, the cash can apply to a down payment instead. It can be used to keep a payment under a certain dollar amount. A lender could suggest paying discount points to lower the buyer's interest rate and make the buyer's payment more affordable. If the buyer cannot afford to pay points and his or her down payment at closing, his or her agent asks the seller to pay all or part of the discount points and closing costs in his or her offer instead of asking for a reduced price. The seller gets the same net as the offer and the buyer gets to keep the points he or she wants while still keeping the cash needed to pay the whole down payment.
