= Live Well Financial =

American mortgage originator

Live Well Financial Inc.
- Industry: Financial services
- Founded: April 2005
- Founder: Michael Hild
- Defunct: 2019
- Fate: Charged and convicted of fraud
- Headquarters: 1011 Boulder Spring Dr #420, Richmond, VA, United States
- Key people: Michael Hild, CEO/Founder; Eric Rohr, CFO (2008-2018); Darren Stumberger, head trader (2014-2019)
- Products: Mortgages
- Number of employees: 300+ (2016)
- Criminal information
- Criminal charges: Securities fraud, wire fraud, bank fraud

Live Well Financial, Inc. ("LWF") was an American privately owned mortgage originator, servicer and investor that operated between 2005 and 2019 when it was put into involuntary bankruptcy.

Prior to its demise, it was licensed in the United States to operate in 46 states. The company offered government-insured Home Equity Conversion Mortgage loans (HECM, commonly known as reverse mortgages), FHA single family mortgage loans, and Fannie Mae conforming loans. LWF was headquartered in Richmond, Virginia and had 3 retail origination branches, 2 in Richmond, Virginia and 1 in San Diego, California, with origination capabilities throughout the United States.

The company and its principals were the focus of criminal and civil charges alleging a large-scale financial fraud in 2021, which the company's CEO, CFO, and head trader were found guilty of in a federal court. In 2019, Live Well was placed under involuntary bankruptcy protection.

== History ==
Live Well Financial, Inc. was founded in April 2005 by Michael C. Hild, chairman and chief executive officer. In August 2005, the company received approval as a HUD Approved Mortgagee.

In August 2006, the company was approved as a seller/servicer of HECM with the Federal National Mortgage Association (FNMA).

In March 2011, the company was approved for HUD Federal Housing Administration (FHA) single-family FHA loans.

In February 2012, the company was approved as a Government National Mortgage Association (GNMA) Home Equity Conversion Mortgage-Backed Security (HMBS) issuer and issued its first HMBS in April of that year.

In March 2013, the company was approved for GNMA MBS loans. In June 2013, the company was approved as a seller/servicer of traditional mortgages with FNMA.

During the first quarter of 2014 the company opened a retail call center in San Diego, CA. And in the fourth quarter of 2014 it opened a retail call center in Richmond, VA. In August 2014, the company acquired a securities portfolio with a balance exceeding $530 million (notional) and hired a NYC based trading team. LWF has originated and serviced more than $3.3 billion in mortgage loans in the U.S. and Puerto Rico.

As of May 3, 2019, Live Well Financial shut down active operations. All forward loans and loan applications in process with them at the time (without closing documents finalized) were notified that they were not funding. All 103 employees were abruptly laid off four months before CEO Michael Hild's arrest, and the company was placed under involuntary bankruptcy protection.

Live Well Financial no longer has a working website, however their LinkedIn page is still available to the public. Their former website, LiveWell.com, is no longer affiliated with Live Well Financial, and now serves as an educational resource with financial literacy articles.

== Criminal trial ==
In April 2021, Live Well CEO Michael Hild was tried in a federal court on five counts of fraud: one count of conspiracy to commit securities fraud, one count of conspiracy to commit wire and bank fraud, one count of securities fraud, one count of wire fraud and one count of bank fraud. The SEC charged Hild of fraudulently inflating the value of Live Well's portfolio of bonds to convince lenders to loan more money to Live Well. Eric Rohr, who was Live Well Financial's CFO from 2008 to late 2018, and Darren Stumberger, Live Well's head trader from 2014 to March 2019, were also charged for their parts in the alleged counts of fraud. In a parallel action, the U.S. District Court for the Southern District of New York filed criminal charges against Hild, Rohr, and Stumberger.

Hild was sentenced to 44 months in prison. In March 2023, Hild appealed his sentence, contending that his representation in this case was unable to give him proper legal counsel. He was initially granted bail pending the outcome of his appeal, which was later denied in July 2025. Stumberger and Rohr both pleaded guilty to all five criminal counts. Eric Rohr was sentenced to time served and three years of supervised release, a relatively light sentence, for his cooperation in the trial.

== Scope ==
The company originated FHA Insured HECM reverse mortgages, FHA single-family loans, Ginnie Mae HMBS and MBS mortgages, and Fannie Mae conforming loans. LWF was HUD approved in 81 geographical areas. LWF had approximately 300 employees, including loan officers, account executives, and support personnel.

LWF was vertically integrated, with a full complement of products and business lines including origination, servicing, and investment management. Live Well Financial was licensed in 46 states with a full suite of regulatory approvals including HUD, FHA, GNMA, and FNMA.
