= Second mortgage =

Additional loan

Second mortgages, commonly referred to as junior liens, are loans secured by a property in addition to the primary mortgage. Depending on the time at which the second mortgage is originated, the loan can be structured as either a standalone second mortgage or piggyback second mortgage. Whilst a standalone second mortgage is opened subsequent to the primary loan, those with a piggyback loan structure are originated simultaneously with the primary mortgage. With regard to the method in which funds are withdrawn, second mortgages can be arranged as home equity loans or home equity lines of credit. Home equity loans are granted for the full amount at the time of loan origination in contrast to home equity lines of credit which permit the homeowner access to a predetermined amount which is repaid during the repayment period.

Depending on the type of loan, interest rates charged on the second mortgage may be fixed or varied throughout the loan term. In general, second mortgages are subject to higher interest rates relative to the primary loan as they possess a higher level of risk for the second lien holder. In the event of foreclosure, in which the borrower defaults on the real estate loan, the property used as collateral to secure the loan is sold to pay debts for both mortgages. As the second mortgage has a subordinate claim to the sale of assets, the second mortgage lender receives the remaining proceeds after the first mortgage has been paid in full and therefore, may not be completely repaid. In addition to ongoing interest repayments, borrowers incur initial costs associated with the origination, application and evaluation of the loan. The charges related to the processing and underwriting the second mortgage are referred to as the application fee and origination fee respectively. Borrowers are also subject to additional costs which are charged by the lender, appraiser and broker.

When refinancing, if the homeowner wants to refinance the first mortgage and keep the second mortgage, the homeowner has to request a subordination from the second lender to let the new first lender step into the first lien holder position. Due to lender guidelines, it is rare for conventional loans for a property having a third or fourth mortgage. In situations when a property is lost to foreclosure and there is little or no equity, the first lien holder has the option to request a settlement for less with the second lien holder to release the second mortgage from the title. Once the second lien holder releases themselves from the title, they can come after the homeowner in civil court to pursue a judgement. At this point, the only option available to the homeowner is to accept the judgment or file bankruptcy.

== Second mortgage types ==
=== Lump sum ===
Second mortgages come in two main forms, home equity loans and home equity lines of credit. A home equity loan, commonly referred to as a lump sum, is granted for the full amount at the time of loan origination. Interest rates on such loans are fixed for the entire loan term, both of which are determined when the second mortgage is initially granted. These close ended loans require borrowers to make principal-and-interest repayments on a monthly basis in a process of amortisation. The interest repayments are the costs associated with borrowing whilst the principal paid reduces the loan balance. With each subsequent repayment, the total amount remains constant however the portion related to the interest cost decreases whilst the amount corresponding to the principal increases. This ensures the loan is completely paid off at the end of the payment schedule. Home equity loans are commonly used for debt consolidation or current consumption expenditures as there is generally lower risk associated with fixed interest rates.

=== Line of credit ===
Home equity lines of credit are open ended loans in which the amount borrowed each month may vary at the homeowner's discretion. These loans offer flexible repayments schedules and are subject to variable interest rates that may potentially increase or decrease during the loan term. Borrowers have access to the line amount which is predetermined at the time of loan origination but are not required to draw amounts if they do not wish to. The revolving credit facility provides borrowers the flexibility of drawing down amounts only when required to avoid interest on unnecessary credit. This ensures a minimum debt level is maintained as monthly repayments correspond only to the amounts used rather than the full amount available. Home equity loans are commonly used when borrowers anticipate future consumption expenditures as well as credit shocks which affect access to credit in the future.

== Second mortgage loan structure ==
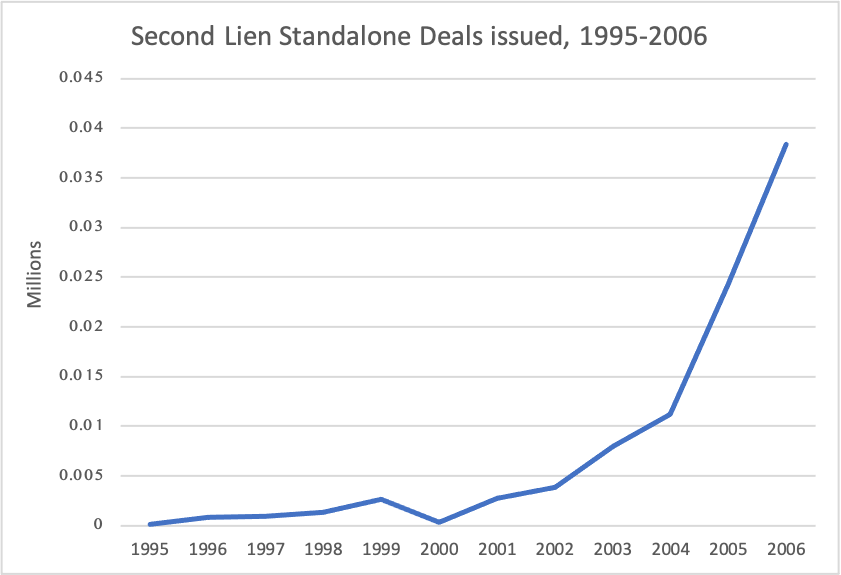
Standalone second lien deals issued, 1995-2006

=== Standalone second mortgage ===
Second mortgages can be structured as either a standalone deal or a piggyback loan. Standalone second mortgages are opened subsequent to the primary mortgage loan to access home equity without disrupting the existing arrangement. Typically, the home buyer purchases a primary mortgage for the full amount and pays the required 20 percent down payment. During the loan term, monthly mortgage repayments and appreciating real estate prices increase the property's equity. In such instances, standalone second mortgages are able to use the property's equity as collateral to access additional funds. This financing option also offers competitive interest rates relative to unsecured personal loans which reduce monthly repayments. With reference to unsecured personal loans, lenders are exposed to a greater level of risk as collateral is not required to secure or guarantee the amounts owed. If the borrower were to default on their repayments, the lender is not able to sell assets to cover the outstanding debt. Accordingly, second mortgages not only ensure access to greater amounts but also lower interest rates comparative to unsecured loans. With increased cash flow, second mortgages are used to finance a variety of expenditures at the discretion of the borrow including home renovations, college tuition, medical expenses and debt consolidation.

=== Piggyback second mortgage ===
Piggyback second mortgages are originated concurrently with the first mortgage to finance the purchase of a home in a single closing process. In a conventional mortgage arrangement, homebuyers are permitted to borrow 80 percent of the property's value whilst placing a down payment of 20 percent. Those unable to obtain the downpayment requirement must pay the additional expense of private mortgage insurance (PMI) which serves to protect lenders during the event of foreclosure by covering a portion of the outstanding debt owed by the buyer. Hence, the option of opening a second mortgage is specifically applicable to buyers who have insufficient funds to pay a 20 percent down payment and wish to avoid paying PMI. Typically, there are two forms in which the piggyback second mortgage can take. The more common of the two is the 80/10/10 mortgage arrangement in which the home buyer is granted an 80 percent loan-to-value (LTV) on the primary mortgage and 10 percent LTV on the second mortgage with a 10 percent down payment. The piggyback second mortgage can also be financed through an 80/20 loan structure. In contrast to the previous method, this arrangement does not require a down payment whilst still permitting home buyers 80 percent LTV on the primary mortgage and 20 percent LTV on the second mortgage.

== Repayment ==
=== Ongoing interest repayments ===
Varying interest rate policies apply to different types of second mortgages. These include home equity loans and home equity lines of credit. With regard to home equity loans, lenders advance the full amount at the time of loan origination. Consequently, homeowners are required to make principal-and-interest loan repayments for the entire amount on a monthly schedule. The fixed interest rate charged on such loans is set at the time of loan origination which ensures constant monthly repayments throughout the loan term. In contrast, home equity lines of credit are open-ended and based on a variable interest rate. During the borrowing period, homeowners are permitted to borrow up to a predetermined amount which must be repaid during the repayment period. Whilst variable interest charges may permit lower initial repayments, these rates have the potential to increase over the duration of the repayment period. Second mortgage interest rate payments are also tax deductible given certain conditions are met. This advantage of second mortgages reduces the borrower's taxable income by the value of the interest expense. In general, total monthly repayments on the second mortgage are lower than that of the first mortgage. This is due to the smaller amount borrowed in the second mortgage compared to the primary loan rather than the difference in interest rate. Second mortgage interest rates are typically higher due to the related risk of such loans. During the event of foreclosure, the primary mortgage is repaid first with the remaining funds used to satisfy the second mortgage. This translates to a higher level of risk for the second mortgage lender as they are less likely to receive sufficient funds to cover the amounts borrowed. Consequently, second mortgages are subject to higher interest rates to compensate for the associated risk of foreclosure. They are also commonly used in Canada when borrowers wish to access home equity without altering the interest rate, amortization, or maturity date of an existing first mortgage.

=== Closing costs ===
Second mortgagors are subject to upfront fees associated with closing cost of obtaining the mortgage in addition to ongoing payments. These include application and origination fees as well as charges to the lender, appraiser and broker. The application fee is charged to potential borrowers for processing the second mortgage application. This fee varies between lenders and is typically non-refundable. The origination fee is charged at the lender's discretion and is associated with the costs of processing, underwriting and funding the second mortgage. Also referred to as the lender's fee, points are a percentage of the loan that is charged by the lender. With each point translating to one percentage of the loan amount, borrowers have the option to pay this fee in order to decrease the loan interest rate. Whilst paying points increases upfront payments, borrowers are subject to lower interest rates which decrease monthly repayments over the loan term. Second mortgages are dependent upon the property's equity which is likely to vary over time due to changes in the property's value. Professional appraisers who assess the market value of the home result in an additional cost to potential borrowers. A broker fee, associated with the service of providing advice and arranging the second mortgage, is also incurred by borrowers.

== Trends in second mortgages ==
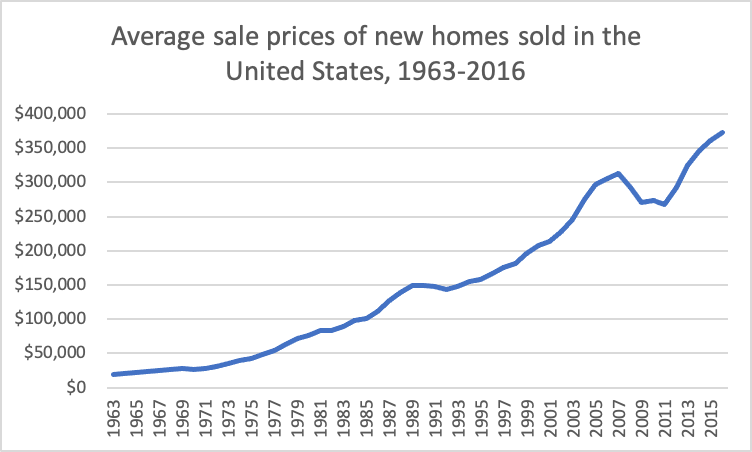
Average sale prices of new homes sold in the United States, 1963-2016

=== Real estate prices ===
Escalating real estate prices are common in low interest rate environments which increase borrowing capacity, in addition to lower underwriting standards and mortgage product innovation that provide greater access to credit. These factors contribute to an increase in real estate demand and housing prices. The implication of such environments is the increase in cost of purchasing a property in terms of down payments and monthly mortgage repayments. Whilst conventional primary mortgages permit home buyers to borrow up to 80 percent of the property's value, they are conditional on a 20 percent down payment. Home buyers who have insufficient funds to meet this requirement must pay primary mortgage insurance (PMI) in addition to interest on the primary loan. This expense can vary in cost depending on the size of down payment, credit score and type of loan issued. For this reason, second mortgages are particularly attractive in appreciating housing environments as they permit home buyers with a less than 20% down payment to borrow additional amounts to qualify for a primary mortgage without the purchase of PMI. These non-traditional mortgage products can decrease the cost of financing a home or enable homebuyers to qualify for more expensive properties. From a lender's perspective, increasing real estate prices create the incentive to originate mortgages as the credit risk is compensated by the increasing value of the property. For the same reason, existing homeowners have access to greater home equity, which can be used as a source for additional funds by opening a second mortgage. In aggregate, as the prices in the real estate market continues to rise, the demand for second mortgages and other non-traditional mortgage products tends to increase.

=== Interest rates ===
Lower interest rates increase the capacity to sustain a given level of debt, encouraging homeowners to withdraw housing equity in the form of second mortgages. Specifically, lower interest rates reduce the interest charged on loans and decrease the total cost of borrowing. In the context of mortgage markets, this translates to reduced monthly mortgage payments for homeowners and additional incentives for potential home buyers to increase borrowing. This affects the loan amount granted in addition to the number of applicants who qualify for higher levels of debt. With respect to a decreasing interest rate, low-income home buyers who were previously ineligible, are able to qualify for cheaper home loans despite higher debt-to-income levels.

== History of second mortgages ==
=== Australia ===
Prior to financial deregulation in the 1980s, the Australian mortgage market was dominated by a small number of banks and lending institutions. This imposed limited competitive pressures as the financial system was closed to foreign banks and offshore transactions. Due to stringent regulatory practices in the 1960s, banks were competitively disadvantage relative to non-bank financial intermediaries which led to a loss in market share. This continued until the mortgage market was financially deregulated in the 1980s which permitted banks to operate more competitively against finance companies, merchant banks, and building societies. Following this, the mortgage market was additionally exposed to international competition which granted greater levels of credit to financial institutions. During this period the use of financial brokers between borrowers and lenders increased as mortgage brokers entered the market. This component of the non-banking sector grew significantly during the 1990s and contributed to 10 percent of all housing loans written. Due to high real estate demand, housing loans became extremely profitable which increased competition for incumbent banks. Whilst existing lenders began to offer honeymoon loans with discounted interest rates for the first year, they were hesitant to lower standard variable rates as this would decrease interest rates on existing loans. In contrast, mortgage brokers utilised securitisation to obtain cheap funding and offer rates 1 to 1.5ppt lower than existing lenders. By originating loans and selling them to securities, mortgage brokers obtained commissions and fees for origination without retaining the risk of low quality loans. This created strong financial incentives to originate large volumes of loans regardless of the risk and was reflected in the minimal entry qualifications for participants, the use of commissions for the remuneration for brokers, lack of accountability and poor advice provided to consumer clients. In combination with poor mortgage origination standards and practices, the non-banking sector also offered a variety of financial products in excess of traditional loans and mortgages. The products included second mortgages, non-conforming loans, reverse mortgages, share equity mortgages, internet and phone banking, mobile mortgage lenders, redraw facilities, offset accounts and debit cards linked to mortgages. As the growth of financial provision increased, banks were pressured to utilise these products and accept lower margins.

=== United States ===
Poor underwriting standards by banks and lending institutions played a significant role in the rapid increase of second mortgages during the early 2000s prior to the 2008 financial crisis. This was heavily influenced by economic incentives and opportunities that arose during the United States housing bubble which encouraged riskier loans and lending practices. Mortgage brokers and lenders offered affordability products with 100 percent LTV. This permitted potential homeowners to purchase properties with zero down payment and limited borrower documentation. Additionally, Fannie Mae and Freddie Mac provided similar deals to low-income borrowers including loans with LTV ratios exceeding 90 percent of the property's value. As lending standards continued to relax, LTV ratios extended to 107 percent which reflected home buyers rolling application and origination fees onto their mortgage loans.

== Documentation ==
Obtaining a second mortgage is similar to purchasing a home, with the lender requiring a variety of information and documentation to make a decision on the application:

- Pay stubs
- Tax returns
- Bank statements
- Completed loan application
- Bad Lending Practices

Second mortgages often present potential problems that are not typical with a conventional home purchase.

- Balloon payments
- Voluntary insurance
- Prepayment penalties

== See also ==
- Home equity loan
- Mortgage Investment Corporation
- Mortgage loan
- Mortgage law
- Refinancing
