= Mortgage equity withdrawal =

In economics, mortgage equity withdrawal (MEW) is the decision of consumers to borrow money against the real value of their houses. The real value is the current value of the property less any accumulated liabilities (mortgages, loans, etc.) Some authors also use equity extraction and include net payments received at time of house sale. In this case, the traditional usage of equity extraction is the purchase of a new house.

The rate of MEW has been linked to Marginal propensity to consume (MPC), as measured by Personal Consumption Expenditure (PCE). In the United States, during the dramatic rise in house prices MEW funded PCE 1.1 to 1.7% from 1991 to 2000, and almost 3% from 2000 to 2005 and was responsible for more than 75% of GDP growth from 2003 to 2006.

While economists consider borrowing against home equity to be analogous to 'withdrawal' it is, in fact, simply collateralization of an asset. As an economic metric, it is very useful to do so; however, this view is a balance sheet phenomenon and not actual conversion of home equity into cash. The sole means of withdrawal of home equity is the downsizing of the asset in a manner which does not result in establishing a lien against the entire asset. A lien puts the entire asset at risk; downsizing simply converts equity into cash, leaving the balance of the value of the asset intact.

== See also ==
- Home equity
- Home equity loan
- HELOC
- Reverse mortgage

== Bibliography ==
- Ritholtz, Barry (2009). Bailout Nation. Hoboken, NJ: Wiley. ISBN 978-0-470-59632-6.
