= Discount points =

Pre-paid mortgage interest

Discount points, also called mortgage points or simply points, are a form of pre-paid interest available in the United States when arranging a mortgage. One point equals one percent of the loan amount. By charging a borrower points, a lender effectively increases the yield on the loan above the amount of the stated interest rate. Borrowers can offer to pay a lender points as a method to reduce the interest rate on the loan, thus obtaining a lower monthly payment in exchange for this up-front payment. For each point purchased, the loan rate is typically reduced by anywhere from 1/8% (0.125%) to 1/4% (0.25%).

Selling the property or refinancing prior to this break-even point will result in a net financial loss for the buyer while keeping the loan for longer than this break-even point will result in a net financial savings for the buyer. Accordingly, if the intention is to buy and sell the property or refinance, paying points will cost more than just paying the higher interest rate.

Points may also be purchased to reduce the monthly payment for the purpose of qualifying for a loan. Loan qualification based on monthly income versus the monthly loan payment may sometimes only be achievable by reducing the monthly payment through the purchasing of points to buy down the interest rate, thereby reducing the monthly loan payment.

Discount points may be different from an origination fee, mortgage arrangement fee, or broker fee. Discount points are always used to buy down the interest rate, while origination fees are sometimes administrative fees the lender charges for the loan, or sometimes just another term for buying down the rate. Origination fees and discount points are both listed under lender charges on the Closing Disclosure (which replaced the HUD-1 Settlement Statement for most U.S. mortgages in 2015).

The difference in savings over the life of the loan can make paying points a benefit to the borrower. Any significant changes in fees must be re-disclosed in a revised Loan Estimate (which replaced the good faith estimate or GFE in 2015).

Also directly related to points is the concept of the 'no closing cost loan', in which the consumer accepts a higher interest rate in return for the lender paying the loan's closing costs up front. In some cases, a purchaser can negotiate with the seller to get them to pay seller's points which can be used to pay mortgage points.

== Service release premium ==
A service release premium (SRP) is the payment received by a lending institution, such as a bank or retail mortgage lender, on the sale of a closed mortgage loan to the secondary mortgage market. The secondary mortgage market purchaser is typically a Wall Street investment bank, Fannie Mae, Freddie Mac, or Ginnie Mae, as the first step in the creation of a mortgage-backed security (MBS). Today, virtually all mortgages closed are purchased by the US government through the GSE Mortgage Backed Securities Purchase Program.

The amount of SRP paid is based on the market value of the mortgage note, influenced by several key variables, such as interest rate, loan type, margin (for ARM loans), and the inclusion or exclusion of other items such as prepayment penalties. Also considered are the loan's LTV (loan to value), the borrower's credit score, the presence of private mortgage insurance (PMI), pre-payment risk of the borrower and other factors beyond the scope of this article.

Since servicing was brought on balance sheet by all lenders there has been consolidation in the servicing market because many servicers believed that they could cross sell their products through servicing portfolios. While this strategy hasn't been as profitable as many would have thought it has worked well for some. These servicers therefore paid a premium for servicing compared to its present value.
