= Yung-Ping Chen =

American economist and gerontologist (1930–2022)

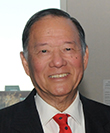
- Born: November 24, 1930; Jingjiang (Jiangsu Province), China
- Died: May 10, 2022 (aged 91); Seattle, United States

Academic background
- Education: National Taiwan University, University of Washington

Academic work
- Discipline: Economics, Gerontology
- Institutions: University of Massachusetts Boston
- Notable ideas: Funding Social Security and long-term care, home-equity conversion (reverse mortgage)
- Awards: Robert W. Kleemeier Award for Outstanding Research (Gerontological Society of America, 2010); John S. Bickley Founder's Award Gold Medal for Excellence (International Insurance Society, 2012)

Yung-Ping Chen (November 24, 1930 – May 10, 2022) was an American economist and gerontologist of Chinese origin. He pioneered the concept of home equity conversion (reverse mortgages) in the United States and developed innovative approaches to the funding of Social Security benefits and long-term care. His scholarship contributed to a better understanding of the economic, political, and social implications and challenges created by the "mass aging" phenomenon—the ongoing and unprecedented shift to an increasingly elder-populated society.

== Biography ==
Born in Jingjiang, Jiangsu Province, China, Chen went to the United States for graduate school in 1955 and remained there to teach economics and gerontology for 50 years. He retired in 2009. He was married and had three children and six grandchildren, including John Rose. A graduate of National Taiwan University in Taipei, he received his M.A. and Ph.D. in economics at the University of Washington, Seattle. He was professor emeritus of gerontology and a fellow in the Gerontology Institute at the University of Massachusetts Boston, where he was the first holder of the Frank J. Manning Eminent Scholar's Chair in Gerontology, a professorship established by the Massachusetts Legislature in 1988, and where he participated in launching the Ph.D. program in gerontology. Previously he was professor of economics and the first holder of the Frank M. Engle Distinguished Chair in Economic Security Research at the American College, Bryn Mawr, PA. Prior to that he taught at UCLA, Seattle Pacific College (now University), and the University of Washington. He served as delegate and/or consultant to four consecutive White House Conferences on Aging (1971 to 2005) and as delegate to the 1998 White House Conference on Social Security. A founding member of the National Academy of Social Insurance, he was a fellow in both the Gerontological Society of America and the World Demographic Association. He received the Actuarial Foundation's John E. Hanson Memorial Prize (2009, co-recipient), the Gerontological Society of America's Robert W. Kleemeier Award for Outstanding Research (2010), and the International Insurance Society's John S. Bickley Founder's Award Gold Medal for Excellence (2012).

== Work ==
Chen's research and associated program and policy proposals were founded on the principles of (a) fostering personal responsibility and societal solidarity by combining public- and private-sector programs and policies when feasible; (b) addressing the inevitable contingencies of individual and societal finances by employing risk-pooling mechanisms of both private and social insurance; (c) augmenting the potential benefits from finite budget resources facing individual, household, or government by means of tradeoffs; and (d) placing greater value on enhancing income generation opportunities for individuals than on providing financial assistance to them, while recognizing the need for the latter under certain circumstances. His portfolio of work, embodied in some 200 publications, encompassed a range of concepts, policies, and programs that have advanced the knowledge base regarding old-age economic security from both the individual and the societal point of view. Chen's work fell principally into six areas:

1. Home-equity conversion (reverse mortgage)
2. Financing and benefit structure of Social Security
3. Funding long-term care
4. Gaps in private pension coverage for minority workers
5. Work and retirement options for older workers
6. Special tax treatments and economic status of the aged

=== Home-equity conversion (reverse mortgage) ===
In the early 1960s Chen began conducting research on income and wealth distribution among older persons. In an effort to address the dilemma of some older people being "income-poor and house-rich," Chen made the case for a voluntary conversion of home equity into annuity income as a means by which older homeowners could augment their income from other sources and keep their homes, while lessening the pressure on societal assistance programs. His 1973 monograph on the receptivity of home-equity conversion (reverse mortgage) inspired the first National Reverse Mortgage Development Conference in May 1979. The theory of home-equity conversion received a major boost in the policy arena when the reverse-mortgage concept was endorsed by the 1981 White House Conference on Aging. The first reverse mortgage was issued in 1989 under an FHA-guaranteed Home Equity Conversion Mortgage (HECM) as a pilot program authorized by the 1987 Housing and Community Development Act. The program was made permanent by an act of Congress in 1998.

=== Financing and benefit structure of Social Security ===
Chen made a number of contributions to policy development in the area of Social Security, one of his career-long research interests. He developed the concept of "total dependency ratio" (which combines the ratios to the working-age population of both aged beneficiaries and dependent children) as an improved method for evaluating overall costs of dependent populations. His analysis of the topic was discussed at the 1979 Advisory Council on Social Security, and the Social Security trustees' annual report to Congress began reporting total dependency ratios along with aged dependency ratios, a practice that continues today.

Against a backdrop of intensifying public debate in the late 1970s about Social Security's long-term solvency, a 1981 article by Chen was the first to call attention to the implications of proliferating employee fringe benefits for the solvency of Social Security. This work helped guide financing discussions throughout the Social Security "crisis debates" of the 1980s. Chen's 1980 introductory Social Security text discussed the implications of changing family patterns for the benefit structure of Social Security. It pointed out that the largely static (and therefore outdated) Social Security benefit structure leaves the most financially vulnerable people—often women, minorities, and children—with increasingly less or no protection. He has continued to write and testify on this subject, urging legislative attention to the need to provide improved Social Security benefits not only to retired and disabled workers but also to their eligible dependents and survivors, including children.

In the 1990s, in an effort to resolve politically contentious debates regarding Social Security reform, Chen designed the "Social Security Plus Pension Supplement Plan" (SS + PS), combining social insurance and individual accounts, as a means for eliminating Social Security's long-range deficit while maintaining or improving rates of return for future beneficiaries. Envisioned as a 10-year national demonstration project that could be acceptable to both advocates of individual accounts and proponents of traditional methods of raising revenues and reducing benefits via social insurance principles, the plan was included in the document issued by the 1998 White House Conference on Social Security.

=== Funding long-term care ===
In 1989 Chen proposed the idea of "trading off" a small portion of Social Security benefits (exempting low earners from the trade-off for this benefit) to create a "Social Security/Long-Term Care Plan" (SS/LTC) that would provide a basic level of long-term-care protection using the social insurance mechanism. The plan is based on a new model of public and private partnership consisting of a public social insurance benefit as a base, with supplementation from private long-term-care insurance and individual payments, while Medicaid (a welfare program) is kept as a safety net for the poor. SS/LTC is designed to make paying for long-term care more rational and dependable by (1) employing the insurance principle in the design of both private- and public-sector programs and (2) creating linkages to combine several sources of funds that currently exist both privately and publicly.

=== Gaps in private pension coverage for minority workers ===
Chen was among the first to investigate the different coverage rates for black and Hispanic workers under private pension programs. His research in this area explored the nature of growing gaps in pension coverage between these minority workers and white workers, one result of which was to identify the "voluntary" nature of salary reduction plans (such as 401ks) as a key factor in these coverage gaps, since minority workers were less likely to elect enrollment in such programs.

=== Work and retirement options for older workers ===
Chen's 1987 article, "Making Assets out of Tomorrow's Elderly," marked the beginning of his writing and research on the concept of "productive aging" and its associated implications for work and retirement. This concept is premised on the benefits of a changed societal perspective toward older people, recognizing their value as potential societal assets rather than primarily as societal liabilities. One outgrowth of such a perspective shift was the notion of "gradual retirement," based on growing concerns about a projected workforce decline as Baby Boomers reached retirement age, along with survey results that reflected many older people's interest in continuing to work part-time after retirement. Recognition of the many practical issues and complexities associated with phased retirement led Chen to argue for increased awareness of the need, both in the U.S. and abroad, for strategies that would create more work flexibility for workers in general—regardless of age, gender, or disability status—as a means of increasing the labor supply and promoting social cohesion via a universal policy that does not, de facto, pit one group of workers against another.

=== Special tax treatments and economic status of the aged ===
Chen's interest in the economic circumstances of the aged dated to the beginnings of his career in the early 1960s, during which he conducted research examining the efficacy of tax measures favoring older people. As a result of this work his assistance was sought in the crafting and implementation of innovative "circuit-breaker" legislation in Wisconsin (involving property tax relief to older renters) and in California (involving a sliding scale for property tax concession, based on the assessed value of the older person's home and his or her income). His subsequent scholarship and policy development on the economic circumstances of older people emphasized the combined role of macroeconomic policies and individual behavior in providing economic security, while also stressing the problematic nature of achieving economic security in old age without accessible and adequately financed health care and long-term care.

== Selected bibliography ==
=== Home-equity conversion (reverse mortgage) ===
- Chen, Y-P. Taxation of the aged: Some issues and possible solutions. Proceedings, 58th Annual Conference of the National Tax Association, 1965, 206–225.
- Chen, Y-P. A pilot survey study of the Housing-Annuity Plan (HAP), monograph submitted to Department of Housing and Urban Development, Washington, DC, published as Occasional Paper No. 6 by Housing, Real Estate, and Urban Land Studies Program. Los Angeles: University of California, 1973.
- Chen, Y-P. Making a theory work: The case of homeownership by the aged. August 1, 1969 Hearings on Homeownership Aspects of the Economics of the Aging, Special Committee on Aging, Subcommittee on Housing for the Elderly, U.S. Senate, 91st Congress, 1st Session (Washington, DC: U.S. Government Printing Office, 1969), 829–845. (http://www.aging.senate.gov/publications/7311969.pdf) (Reprinted in Aging and Human Development, 1970, 1, 919)
- Chen, Y-P. Unlocking home equity for the elderly (Ed. with K. Scholen). Cambridge, MA: Ballinger, 1980.

=== Financing and benefit structure of Social Security ===
- Chen, Y-P. The growth of fringe benefits: Implications for Social Security. Monthly Labor Review, November 1981, 3–10.
- Chen, Y-P. Social Security in a changing society. Bryn Mawr, PA: McCahan Foundation for Research in Economic Security, The American College, 1980 (1st ed.) and 1983 (2nd ed.).
- Chen, Y-P. Changing family roles: Their impact on benefit programs. In D. L. Salisbury (Ed.), America in transition: Implications for employee benefits. Washington, DC: Employee Benefit Research Institute, 1982, 5–14.
- Chen, Y-P. Social Security reform: A worldwide phenomenon. Journal of Aging and Social Policy, 2002, 14(1), 1–8.

=== Funding long-term care ===
- Chen, Y-P. Tie long-term care to Social Security. The New York Times, A18. September 18, 1989. (https://www.nytimes.com/1989/09/18/opinion/l-tie-long-term-care-to-social-security-154089.html)
- Chen, Y-P. A "three-legged stool": A new way to fund long-term care? In Care in the long term: In search of community and security. Institute of Medicine. Washington, DC: National Academy Press, 1993, 54–70.
- Chen, Y-P. Financing long-term care: An intragenerational social insurance model. The Geneva Papers on Risk and Insurance, No. 73, October 1994, 490–495.
- Chen, Y-P. Funding long-term care in the United States: The role of private insurance. The Geneva Papers on Risk and Insurance, 2001, 26(4), 656–666.
- Chen, Y-P. Funding long-term care: Applications of the trade-off principle in both public and private sectors. Journal of Aging and Health, February 2003, 15(1), 15–44.

=== Gaps in private pension coverage for minority workers ===
- Chen, Y -P. The role of private pensions in the income of older Americans. In J. A. Turner & D.J. Beller (Eds.), Trends in Pensions. Washington, DC: U.S. Department of Labor, 1992, 293–418.
- Chen, Y-P. The widening gap between white and minority pension coverage. The Public Policy and Aging Report, Winter 1997, 10–11.
- Chen, Y-P., & Leavitt, T. D. Employee preferences as a factor in pension participation by minority workers. Boston, MA: Gerontology Institute, University of Massachusetts Boston, November 2002.

=== Work and retirement options for older workers ===
- Chen, Y-P. Making assets out of tomorrow's elderly. The Gerontologist. August 1987, 27(4), 410–416. Reprinted as a chapter in R. Morris & S. A. Bass (Eds.), Retirement reconsidered: Economic and social roles for older people. New York: Springer, 1988, 73–88.
- Chen, Y-P. Achieving a productive aging society (Ed. with S. A. Bass & F. G. Caro). Westport, CT: Auburn House, 1993.
- Chen, Y-P. Gradual retirement in the United States: Macro issues and policies. In L. Delsen & G. Reday-Mulvey (Eds.), Gradual retirement in the OECD countries Hampshire. England: Dartmouth Publishing Company, 1996, 164–176.
- Chen, Y-P. & Scott, J. C. Phased retirement and reduction of work in later career. In S. Sweet & J. Casey (Eds.), Work and family encyclopedia. Sloan Foundation, 2008.
- Chen, Y-P., Wadensjo, E., & Tull, A. Potential labor supply and flexible work options for all workers: An exploratory essay. European Papers on the New Welfare, 2009, 11, 49–57.

=== Special tax treatments and economic status of the aged ===
- Chen, Y-P. Income tax exemptions for the aged as a policy instrument. National Tax Journal, December 1963, 325–336.
- Chen, Y-P. Economic status of the aging. In R. H. Binstock & E. Shanas (Eds.), Handbook of aging and the social sciences (2nd ed.). New York: Van Nostrand Reinhold, 1985, 641–665.
- Chen, Y-P. Better options for work and retirement: Some suggestions for improving economic security mechanisms for old-age. In G. L. Maddox & M. P. Lawton (Eds.), Varieties of aging, Annual Review of Gerontology and Geriatrics, No. 8. New York: Springer, 1988, 189–216.
- Chen, Y-P. Income security for the third age: Concepts and sources. Research Dialogues. Teacher Insurance and Annuity Association-College Retirement Equities Fund, 1997, 53, 1–7.
- Chen, Y-P. Racial disparity in retirement income security. In T. P. Miles (Ed.), Directions for policy reform, full-color aging: facts, goals, and recommendations for America's diverse elders. Washington, DC: Gerontological Society of America, 1999, 21–31.
