= Equity release =

UK later-life home equity products

Equity release is a later-life housing finance product in the United Kingdom that allows homeowners to access money tied up in their home equity while continuing to live in the property. The most common forms are lifetime mortgages and home reversion plans. The loan and interest are repaid from the sale of the home after the borrower dies or moves into long-term care. In other countries such as the United States, Australia, and New Zealand comparable products are described as reverse mortgage loans.

Equity release is marketed to older homeowners and can reduce the value of any inheritance and affect eligibility for means-tested benefits. In a lifetime mortgage, interest may be added to the loan balance over time, so the debt can grow substantially if no repayments are made. The Equity Release Council's standards include a no negative equity guarantee, meaning that the borrower or estate will not owe more than the property is worth when it is sold. Equity release products are regulated by the Financial Conduct Authority, and consumer guidance recommends seeking specialist authorised advice before entering a plan.

== Overview ==
Equity release is later-life housing finance that allows homeowners in the United Kingdom to access some of their property's value while continuing to live in it. It is available to homeowners aged 55 or over. The term covers lifetime mortgages and home reversion plans.

The two main regulated structures are lifetime mortgages, where the homeowner borrows against the property, and home reversion plans, where the homeowner sells all or part of the property in exchange for a lump sum or income and the right to remain in the home. The amount owed is usually settled when the borrower dies or moves into long-term care, from the proceeds of selling the property.

Equity release transactions are regulated in the UK by the Financial Conduct Authority under the Mortgage Conduct of Business rules, including disclosure requirements for equity release illustrations. The FCA has also published thematic findings on the lifetime mortgage sales and advice process. Equity release can reduce the value of an estate and may affect eligibility for means-tested benefits, and interest on lifetime mortgages can accumulate over time if it is not paid as it accrues.

=== History ===
In parliamentary debate in 1991, members described a range of arrangements then marketed as equity release schemes, including home reversion schemes and roll-up loans, and noted low take-up while raising concerns about poorly designed products. In December 1991, a group of providers formed Safe Home Income Plans (SHIP) and published a voluntary code of practice which included a no negative equity guarantee and other consumer safeguards.

Statutory regulation for mortgage-based equity release schemes, described as lifetime mortgages, was introduced from 31 October 2004. Home reversion plans became subject to the home finance regulatory regime for plans entered into on or after 6 April 2007.

== Types of equity release ==
=== Lifetime mortgages ===
A lifetime mortgage is a mortgage loan secured on a home that usually does not need to be repaid until the borrower dies or moves into long-term care. The homeowner retains ownership of the property, and interest may be added to the loan balance over time if it is not paid as it accrues. Providers may offer different ways to take the money, including a lump sum or staged withdrawals through a drawdown facility. FCA glossary material describes a lifetime mortgage as a later-life mortgage intended to be repaid from the sale of the property rather than through a fixed repayment schedule.

Lifetime mortgages may be marketed as meeting the Equity Release Council's standards, which include a no negative equity guarantee and expectations about features such as the ability to move home and the option to make repayments within specified conditions.

=== Home reversion plans ===
A home reversion plan is an arrangement where a homeowner sells all or part of their home to a provider for a lump sum or regular income and a right to remain in the property, often under a lifetime tenancy, until death or a move into long-term care. The amount offered can be significantly below the market value of the share sold, reflecting that the provider cannot sell the property until it is permanently vacated. When the property is eventually sold, the proceeds are shared between the homeowner's estate and the provider according to their respective shares.

== Key features ==
Eligibility can depend on factors such as the applicant's age, the property value and the provider's requirements for property types and locations. The amount available is usually limited to a proportion of the property's value and may increase with the age of the borrower.

=== How funds are taken ===
Lifetime mortgages may be taken as a single lump sum, or as smaller withdrawals using a drawdown facility, which can reduce the interest that accumulates compared with taking the full amount at the outset. Some products allow borrowers to make voluntary repayments, which can reduce the balance and the total interest paid, though charges may apply if repayment terms are not met.

Home reversion plans provide funds in exchange for selling a share of the home, usually at a discount to market value, and the provider's share of the eventual sale proceeds reflects the share sold rather than the amount originally paid to the homeowner.

=== Interest and repayment ===
For many lifetime mortgages, interest is added to the loan balance over time if it is not paid as it accrues, which can cause the amount owed to grow. The loan is typically repaid when the last borrower dies or permanently moves into long-term care, usually from the sale proceeds of the home. Some products include early repayment charges if the borrower repays the loan before the usual repayment event.

=== Safeguards and standards ===
In the UK market, products that meet the Equity Release Council's standards include a no negative equity guarantee, meaning the borrower or estate will not be required to repay more than the sale value of the property. The standards include expectations around communicating the effect on inheritance, allowing the borrower to move to another suitable property, and providing the option to make repayments within specified conditions.

== Market ==
Equity Release Council market data reports cover new plans, drawdowns from existing reserves and further advances, based on aggregated returns from UK providers and advice firms. The council has reported that lifetime mortgages make up more than 99% of the UK equity release market.

=== Activity and customer numbers ===
In 2024, the Council reported total annual equity release lending of £2.3 billion, compared with £2.6 billion in 2023. In Q4 2024, it reported £622 million of lending with 15,073 customers active in the quarter, including 5,361 new customers and 8,301 returning drawdown customers. In Q2 2025, the Council reported £636 million of lending across 14,404 total plans, including 5,319 new plans.

Further advances are additional borrowing by existing customers. The Council reported that further advances accounted for less than 7% of the total amount borrowed in Q2 2025, though the number of further advance plans was higher than a year earlier.

=== Product mix, loan sizes and pricing ===
The market includes lump sum lifetime mortgages and drawdown lifetime mortgages, where an initial amount is released and a reserve facility is agreed for later use. The Council reported that drawdown products accounted for 56% of new plans in Q4 2024 and 55% of customers in Q2 2025. It reported average new loan sizes in Q4 2024 of £115,243 for new lump sum plans, £70,926 for new initial drawdowns and £56,565 for new drawdown reserve facilities.

The Council reported that the average APR of new products launched in October 2024 was 6.47%, compared with 7.48% a year earlier, based on data from Advise Wise. In Q2 2025, it reported an average APR of 7.24% and stated that more than 1,669 plans were available for advisers to choose from at the end of June.

=== Relationship to later-life mortgage lending ===
UK Finance publishes separate data on mortgage lending to borrowers aged 55 and over. In Q3 2025 it reported 6,040 new lifetime mortgages advanced with a total value of £530 million, alongside 39,950 new loans to older borrowers across the wider later-life market with a total value of £6.5 billion.

=== Distribution and oversight ===
Equity release plans are commonly arranged through regulated advice and intermediary channels. In 2023, the Financial Conduct Authority reported that a review covering firms responsible for around half of lifetime mortgage sales found advice often did not meet expected standards and prompted the removal or amendment of almost 400 misleading promotions.

=== Funding and investment ===
Insurers hold equity release mortgages as long-term assets to back annuity liabilities, and Prudential Regulation Authority guidance addresses how embedded guarantees such as the no negative equity guarantee are valued and managed in this context.

== Risks and costs ==
Equity release arrangements can involve upfront fees and long-term borrowing costs, and may affect future housing choices and eligibility for means-tested support.

=== Fees and transaction costs ===
Upfront costs can include advice fees, legal fees, valuation fees and lender arrangement or completion fees. For lifetime mortgages, additional costs can arise from early repayment charges if the loan is repaid before the usual repayment event.

=== Interest roll-up, repayment triggers and early repayment ===
For many lifetime mortgages, interest is added to the loan balance over time if it is not paid as it accrues, which can cause the debt to grow through compound interest. Lifetime mortgage interest rates may be higher than those on ordinary mortgages, which can increase the rate at which the balance grows. Repayment is typically triggered when the last borrower dies or permanently moves into long-term care, and the loan is usually repaid from the sale proceeds of the home. Some plans allow voluntary repayments, subject to product terms and potential charges.

=== Moving home and other restrictions ===
Equity release plans can include conditions on how the property is used and maintained, and restrictions may apply such as limits on leaving the home empty for long periods or making major structural changes. Products marketed as meeting the Equity Release Council's standards include expectations around moving to another suitable property, subject to lender criteria.

=== Benefits and care funding interactions ===
Receiving a lump sum or income from an equity release arrangement can affect eligibility for means-tested benefits and local authority support for care. Equity release can reduce the value of a homeowner's estate and the inheritance available to beneficiaries because the loan and accumulated interest are repaid from the proceeds when the home is sold.

=== Home reversion valuation risk ===
Home reversion plans involve selling a share of a home in exchange for funds, and the amount paid can be significantly below the market value of the share sold because the provider cannot sell the property until it is permanently vacated. The homeowner's estate receives a corresponding share of the eventual sale proceeds, which can be less than would have been received if the home had been retained and sold without a reversion arrangement.

=== Advice and suitability ===
The Financial Conduct Authority's multi-firm review of the lifetime mortgage sales and advice process reported shortcomings in how some firms assessed suitability and documented recommendations, and emphasised the need to consider a customer's circumstances, objectives and alternative options. In a later review of later-life mortgages, the FCA reported poor-quality advice at some firms and said it had intervened in response to misleading promotions.

== Consumer protections ==
In the United Kingdom, equity release is a regulated activity and consumer guidance recommends using a specialist equity release adviser or mortgage broker who is authorised by the Financial Conduct Authority. Advisers recommending equity release products must have a specialist qualification in equity release.

=== Disclosure and suitability ===
A specialist adviser provides a personal recommendation and written documentation, including a suitability letter and a Key Facts Illustration outlining the main terms and costs of the recommended plan. FCA disclosure rules require firms selling lifetime mortgages to provide a standardised illustration intended to help borrowers compare products and understand key features such as the cost of borrowing and any regular payments.

=== Legal advice ===
Equity release plans generally require the homeowner to appoint a solicitor to check the offer documentation and legal terms before completion.

=== Product standards and guarantees ===
Products marketed as meeting the Equity Release Council's standards include a no negative equity guarantee, meaning the borrower or estate will not be required to repay more than the value of the property when it is sold. The standards include expectations such as a right to remain in the home for life or until a move into long-term care, and the ability to move to another suitable property subject to lender criteria.

=== Complaints and compensation ===
Consumers who are unhappy with an equity release provider or advice can complain to the firm and then, if not satisfied with the response, bring the complaint to the Financial Ombudsman Service. The Financial Services Compensation Scheme may provide compensation for certain types of mortgage advice, including advice relating to lifetime mortgages, if an authorised firm has failed and the claim meets the scheme's conditions and limits.

== United States ==
The term equity release is primarily used in the United Kingdom. In the United States, comparable arrangements are described as reverse mortgage loans, including federally insured Home Equity Conversion Mortgages (HECMs).

== See also ==
- Equity loan
- Mortgage law
- Mortgage loan
- PIV, the Italian equivalent
- UK mortgage terminology
- Reverse mortgage, the American equivalent
