= Nick Wallis =

British broadcaster and journalist

- Occupations: Radio personality, journalist, author
- Website: www.nickwallis.com

Nick Wallis is a British broadcaster and journalist, known for his extensive coverage of the British Post Office Scandal.

== Post office scandal ==
Wallis has reported on the British Post Office Scandal since 2011, having become aware of it while presenting on BBC Radio Surrey.

He made programmes on it for BBC Television's Panorama and presented the ten-part BBC Radio 4 series The Great Post Office Trial. The radio series was named "Best News and Factual Radio Programme" in 2020 by the Voice of the Listener & Viewer, and won two gold awards in the 2021 New York Festivals Radio Awards.

From 2018, having left the BBC, he started reporting the Bates & Others v Post Office Ltd trial on a dedicated blog, www.postofficetrial.com, having raised £9,000 through crowd-funding. He co-wrote Private Eye's 2020 report "Justice Lost in the Post". His book The Great Post Office Scandal was published in 2021. He acted as a consultant on the 2024 television series, Mr Bates vs The Post Office. He also runs his own website about the scandal.

== Other work ==
Wallis covered the Depp v. Heard defamation trial. His book, Depp v Heard: The Unreal Story, about the trials in both the UK and the US and his experiences reporting from court was published in May 2023.

He reports on consumer affairs for BBC Television's The One Show, and reported on shared appreciation mortgages for an episode of their Inside Out South.

He has also worked as a freelance presenter for Channel 5's Caught on Camera.

Wallis writes for Genderblog, a gender-critical website where he describes himself as a "sex-realist".

== Personal life ==
Wallis is married; he and his wife have three children.
