= Home equity =

Market value of a homeowner's unencumbered interest in their real property

Home equity is the homeowner's financial interest in their property, calculated as the difference between the property's current market value and the total outstanding balances of all loans secured by the home.

In the United States, it is a major source of wealth accumulation with the majority of middle class wealth being held in home equity which totals over $35 trillion overall.

== Definition and function ==
Home equity is defined as the market value of a homeowner's unencumbered interest in their real property, that is, the difference between the home's fair market value and the outstanding balance of all liens on the property. It is summarized by the accounting identity, value − debt = equity. In economics, home equity is sometimes called real property value.

Homeowners acquire equity in their home from two sources. They purchase equity with their down payment and the principal portion of any payments they make against their mortgage. Definitionally, this results in the immediate creation of home equity in the amount of the down payment at the time of purchase with equity increasing with each payment (in cases of standard amortizing loans). The property's equity increases as the debtor makes payments against the mortgage balance.

Equity also increases as the property value appreciates as the value of the property increases while the debt remains unchanged. Conversely, home equity may decrease on a property should valuations decline. In extreme cases, this can result in negative equity, often referred to as mortgages which are "underwater" or "upside down". In 2012, approximately 20% of mortgage holders were underwater; negative equity was most concentrated in Nevada where 61% of mortgages were upside down. Arizona (48%), Florida (44%), Michigan (35%), and Georgia (33%) also all showed a high percentage of homeowners with negative equity. Negative equity greatly increases the risk of foreclosure and default since a home sale will no longer fully cover the debt.

Home equity is illiquid. As wealth on paper and not cash in hand, it cannot be readily spent or used for purchases in its current form. An owner must typically sell the property or utilize it as collateral through home equity release products to convert equity into liquid funds.

== Home equity in the United States ==
As of March 2025, homeowners in the United States have over $35 trillion in home equity according to the Federal Reserve Bank of St. Louis.

Since the mid-1900s, home equity has been the primary strategy for the American middle class to build household wealth. In most Americans' portfolios, their home is their largest asset. According to the 2016 Survey of Consumer Finances, home equity contained in households' primary residence accounted for approximately a quarter of their overall assets.

Rise in home values and its use as a "forced savings plan" contribute to record wealth disparity between homeowners and non-owners with homeownership viewed as a key part of the American Dream separating the middle class from the poor. Home equity represents between 50% and 70% of net wealth for Americans in the three middle income quintiles. In the aggregate, home equity accounts for 43% of net worth for the median household. At the turn of the century, home equity's median share of net wealth among households with positive net worth was 27.2% with an average of 35.3%.

The median net worth among homeowners was approximately $400,000 in 2024 compared to $10,000 for renters. This gap has widened over time, nearly doubling (growing by ~70%) between 1989 and 2022. Retention of net worth held in home equity has historically enabled intergenerational wealth transfer and played a key role in intergenerational wealth accumulation. Broad homeownership enabled by the G.I. Bill following World War II allowed the accumulation of home equity which developed the middle class and enabled generational wealth transfers.

Home equity's function as forced savings over the life cycle, results in older homeowners often have substantial home equity, whereas renters tend to have very low wealth in later life, with the gap peaking by retirement for those who own homes. Home equity release products can help retirees access home equity creating additional income and improve retirement security.

Property buyers typically look to purchase properties that will grow in value, causing the equity in the property to increase, thus providing a return on their investment when the property is sold. Pessimistic buyers typically opt for higher leverage through smaller downpayments to limit financial exposure when household needs dictate property size; this pattern is especially pronounced in markets with lower default costs or during anticipated housing downturns.

== Home equity in other developed economies ==
=== United Kingdom ===
In the United Kingdom, 65% of households own their homes including 68% of white British households. Owner-occupiers aged 65 and over hold a record estimated £2.6 trillion of net housing wealth in homes worth a total of £2.735 trillion as of 2017.

=== European Union ===
In the European Union, 70% of the population lived in a household that owned their home. The rate was highest in Romania at over 95% while Germany was lowest and the only EU country where homeowners were a minority.

=== Canada ===
In Canada, 66.5% of Canadian households owned their own home in 2021. The percentage marks a steady decline down from a peak of 69% in 2011 with the sharpest drops among the young cohort priced out of the market as immigration drives housing prices up. Home equity represented 42% of Canadians' total wealth in 2023. Home equity's role as a major driver of household wealth results in a major disparity in average total net worth between homeowners and other Canadians with homeowners having a net worth of up to 30 times that of renters in some demographics.

=== Australia and New Zealand ===
In Australia, 66% of households owned their own home in 2022. Housing wealth represented almost half of Australian household wealth as of 2021 and 2/5th of net assets.

In New Zealand, the rate of homeownership has been rapidly declining with 67% of households owning homes in 2024, down from 74% in 1991, with a drop to 48% expected by 2048.

=== Japan ===
In Japan, 62% of homes in Japan are owner-occupied. In Japan, housing prices largely reflect the price of the land on which the house sits.

=== China ===
China has one of the world's highest homeownership rates with the percentage of those owning their home hitting 90% in 2020. Between 70 and 85% of China's household wealth is stored in its property market.

=== South Korea ===
In South Korea, 61.3% of households owned their home as of 2022. However, only 13.2% of young (defined as having a head of household under 35) households owned their home, a steep decrease from when the statistic was first collected in 2017. This has referred to a phenomenon of young people in Korea being described as the "generation of house poor" with soaring prices making homeownership unobtainable for "dirt spoons".

== Home equity as collateral ==
In the United States, homeowners collectively hold $17.8 trillion in equity including $11.6 trillion that can be extracted while maintaining a 20% cushion.

Home equity management refers to the process of tapping equity via loans, at favorable, and often tax-favored, interest rates, to invest otherwise illiquid equity in a target that offers higher returns. Home equity may serve as collateral for a home equity loan or home equity line of credit. Many home equity plans set a fixed period during which the homeowner can borrow money, such as ten years. At the end of this “draw period,” the borrower may be allowed to renew the credit line. If the plan does not allow renewals, the borrower will not be able to borrow additional money once the period has ended. Some plans may call for payment in full of any outstanding balance at the end of the period. Others may allow repayment over a fixed period, for example, ten years.

=== Home equity release products ===
A number of financial instruments exist to help homeowners access home equity collectively referred to as home equity release products. These allow the conversion of illiquid housing wealth into usable funds, either as lump sums, lines of credit, or income streams. The most common home equity release mechanisms found in the United States include the following:

- Home equity loan (HEL): A fixed-term loan secured against the home's equity, typically disbursed as a lump sum and repaid in equal monthly payments over a set period. The interest rate is usually fixed. These loans are often used for home renovations and other large expenses with a third going to repay non-mortgage debt, a third going towards home improvements, and a fourth to PCE.
- Home equity line of credit (HELOC): A revolving credit line secured by the home, where the borrower can draw and repay funds as needed up to a limit, typically during an initial “draw period” of 5–10 years. Interest rates are often variable. After the draw period, repayment of principal and interest is required.
- Cash-out refinancing: This method replaces the existing mortgage with a larger loan, allowing the homeowner to “cash out” the difference in equity. This is typically used when mortgage rates are favorable and the homeowner seeks liquidity. Some of these are backed by agencies such as the United States Department of Veterans Affairs.
- Reverse mortgage: A loan product typically available to older homeowners (e.g., 62+) that provides funds based on home equity, with no monthly repayment. The loan is repaid upon sale, move-out, or death. Reverse mortgages are regulated in many jurisdictions and often operate under government-insured programs, such as the U.S. Home Equity Conversion Mortgage (HECM).
- Home equity investment (HEI): A financial contract in which a third party (typically an investment firm) provides a lump sum in exchange for a share of the home's future appreciation. There are no monthly payments; the investor is repaid upon sale or after the home equity contract's pre-agreed term. HEIs are relatively new and have been criticized for potential risks and downsides such as reducing future equity upside for homeowners.

Meanwhile, in countries such as the United Kingdom, a set of equity release financial products including lifetime mortgages or home reversion plans allow homeowners to unlock equity while remaining in the home regulated by the Financial Conduct Authority. Lifetime mortgages accrue interest over time but require no monthly payments; the loan is repaid when the home is sold.

Equity release products differ substantially in structure, risk, and tax treatment and different countries have different regulatory regimes for various product types with varying levels of consumer protection. Some have suggested access to home equity release products ultimately harms household welfare by eroding savings commitment with one study suggesting that the welfare losses from weakened discipline outweighing the gains from flexibility by a factor of 1.7 and driving a 2.5 percentage point drop in the personal saving rate.
