= Finance charge =

In US law, any fee representing the cost of credit

In United States law, a finance charge is any fee representing the cost of credit, or the cost of borrowing. It is interest accrued on, and fees charged for, some forms of credit. It includes not only interest but other charges as well, such as financial transaction fees. Details regarding the federal definition of finance charge are found in the Truth-in-Lending Act and Regulation Z, promulgated by the Federal Reserve Board.

In personal finance, a finance charge may be considered simply the dollar amount paid to borrow money, while interest is a percentage amount paid such as annual percentage rate (APR). These definitions are narrower than the typical dictionary definitions or accounting definitions.

Creditors and lenders use different methods to calculate finance charges. The most common formula is based on the average daily balance, in which daily outstanding balances are added together and then divided by the number of days in the month.

In financial accounting, interest is defined as any charge or cost of borrowing money. Interest is a synonym for finance charge. In effect, the accountant looks at the entire cost of settlement on a Housing and Urban Development (HUD) form 1 (the HUD-1 Settlement Statement) document as interest unless that charge can be identified as an escrow amount or an amount that is charged to current expenses or expenditures other than interest, such as payment of current or prorated real estate taxes.

== See also ==
- Interest expense
- Liquidity constraint
