= Good faith estimate =

The CFPB requires that lenders provide customers with a Loan Estimate to help them understand the full cost of buying a home with a mortgage. The Loan Estimate replaces the Good Faith Estimate, or GFE, that was used prior to 2015.

Lenders are required to issue Loan Estimates within three days of receiving a complete loan application, per the TILA-RESPA Integrated Disclosure Rule (TRID). A complete loan application include at least the following: Name, Income, Social Security Number, Property Address, Estimated Value of Property, Mortgage Loan Amount Sought. When these are received, TRID is considered to be triggered and the three-day clock starts.

Loan Estimates are considered binding in that the lender's costs cannot change and if the lender's estimates of third-party costs are off by more than 10% the lender must cover the difference (this is called "curing").

The Loan Estimate covers all the costs associated with buying a home, even if they are not related to the actual mortgage. For example, property taxes are independent of the mortgage but are covered in a Loan Estimate.

== Types of costs ==
Loan Estimates includes three categories of costs: costs that vary across lenders, costs that vary across other providers (e.g., title insurance companies), and costs that do not vary. These categories are explained in this Loan Estimate Explainer.

- Costs that vary across lenders: Application fee, Processing fee, Underwriting fee, Rate, Appraisal, Points or Lender credits, Attorney review fees, Tax service, Flood certification, Condo questionnaire, Credit report fee, and Final inspection charge.
- Costs that vary across other providers: Homeowner’s insurance, Flood insurance, Title insurance, Survey, and Pest inspection. Your lender cannot influence these costs, they are merely required to report them on the loan estimate so that you can have a full picture of your borrowing cost. Lenders estimate these costs, and you should not consider one lender to be more expensive than another just because their estimate is higher.
- Costs that don't vary across lenders: Property taxes, Recording fees, Transfer taxes, Tax stamp fees, HOA fees, County fee. These do not vary by lender or provider, and if they are different from one loan estimate to the next it is due to the lender's understanding of the fees, which may evolve as you make your way to closing.

== Fees and charges ==
The following is a list of the typical charges. Each charge starts with a number – the same number as the number of the charge on a HUD-1 Real Estate Settlement Statement. This makes it easier to compare the charges a loan applicant receives on the good faith estimate to the HUD-1.

800 ITEMS PAYABLE IN CONNECTION WITH LOAN:

- 801 - Loan Origination Fee

This fee is a charge for originating or creating the loan

- 802 - Loan Discount

This is an upfront charge paid to the lender to get a lower mortgage rate – the same as “buying the rate down”

- 803 - Appraisal Fee

This is the cost of the independent appraisal. It is usually paid by the buyer.

- 804 - Credit Report

This is the cost of the credit report. The lender does not have to pass this cost along to the buyer.

- 805 - Lender's Inspection Fee

This is the lender's cost of inspecting a property – some may double check the appraisal provided by an independent appraiser

- 808 - Mortgage Broker Fee

This is the upfront charge that a mortgage broker charges. Brokers can also earn a “rebate” from the lender which is not listed here

- 809 - Tax Related Service Fee

Lender fee, usually small, for handling tax related matters

- 810 - Processing Fee

This is the charge for processing the loan – collecting the buyer's application, running credit, collecting pay stubs, bank statements, ordering appraisal, title, etc. This is often referred to as a "junk fee" and does not need to be included.

- 811 - Underwriting Fee

This is the cost of the loan underwriter (approver). "No fee" lenders typically do not include this and it is typically considered a "junk fee."

- 812 - Wire Transfer Fee

This is the cost of wiring the money around, which is usually done by escrow.

900 ITEMS REQUIRED BY LENDER TO BE PAID IN ADVANCE

- 901 - Interest for days X $ per day

This is the prepaid interest for a mortgage loan.

- 902 - Mortgage Insurance Premium

This is the prepaid mortgage insurance premium, if needed. This is the insurance premium some lenders charge for loans with little equity.

- 903 - Hazard Insurance Premium

This is used to record hazard insurance premiums that must be paid at settlement in order to have immediate insurance on the property. It is not used for insurance reserves that will go into escrow.

- 905 - VA Funding Fee

This is the Veterans Administration funding fee, which is only applicable if the loan is through a VA program.

1000 RESERVES DEPOSITED WITH LENDER

- 1001 - Hazard Insurance Premiums # months @ $ per month

This is any prepayment of future hazard insurance expense

- 1002 - Mortgage Ins. Premium Reserves months @ $ per month

This is any prepayment of future mortgage insurance expense

- 1003 - School Tax months @ $ per month

This is any prepayment of future school tax expense

- 1004 - Taxes and Assessment Reserves months @ $ per month

This is any prepayment of future tax expenses, such as property taxes

- 1005 - Flood Insurance Reserves months @ $ per month months

This is any prepayment of future flood insurance expense

- 1008 - Aggregate Accounting Adjustment

This is a credit to the buyer. By law, the lender is not allowed to collect more than the sum of initial payments for reserve items. The aggregate adjustment is the amount the lender must 'credit' the borrower at closing, so that they don't collect more than the law allows.

1100 TITLE CHARGES

- 1101 - Closing or Escrow Fee

This is the cost of escrow. This is the service of a neutral party that actually handles the money between all the different parties in a real estate transaction, including: the lender, the buyer, the seller, the agents, notary, etc. This is often done by the “Title Company” – a related entity in the same office that provides title insurance

- 1105 - Document Preparation Fee

This is the charge for preparing the loan documents. Lenders often email the loan documents to the escrow company, which in turn prints them out and reviews them before signing. However, some title companies are owned by an attorney who will also draw certain legal documents for the buyer's closing.

- 1106 - Notary Fees

This is the cost of the notary. This is to have all of the legal documents surrounding this transaction notarized. When closing inside the title company office, there is usually no charge for this.

- 1107 - Attorney Fees

Any legal charges associated with clearing the title to the property.

- 1108 - Title Insurance

This is the cost of insuring the title of the property. If there is a question about title (who really owned the property), or if a judgment or lien was really paid off, after the transaction is done then this insurance protects the lender and owner from future problems.

1200 GOVERNMENT RECORDING & TRANSFER CHARGES

- 1201 - Recording Fees

This is the cost of updating relevant government records

- 1202 - City/County Tax/Stamps

Unavoidable government charge

- 1203 - State Tax/Stamps

Unavoidable government charge

- 1204 - Electronic Recording Fee

Many counties now allow documents to be recorded electronically. This expedites the issuance of a title policy by several weeks.

1300 ADDITIONAL SETTLEMENT CHARGES

Anything 'extra' that is not included in the 800-1200 charges are itemized in the 1300 section. This includes things like the survey, HOA fees, and repairs.

- 1302 - Pest Inspection

This is the cost of the pest inspector. Their purpose is to document the state of the property that the lender is making the loan on.

== See also ==
- Title insurance in the United States
- United States Department of Housing and Urban Development
- Truth in Lending Act
- Predatory lending
- Annual percentage rate
- Real estate contract
