= Closing costs =

Fees paid at the closing of a real estate transaction

Closing costs are fees paid at the closing of a real estate transaction. This point in time called the closing is when the title to the property is conveyed (transferred) to the buyer. Closing costs are incurred by either the buyer or the seller.

== Examples of typical closing costs ==
- Attorney (Lawyer) fees, paid by either or both parties, for the preparation and recording of official documents. The principals and/or lender may each be represented by their own attorney. Typically required by institutional/commercial lenders to ensure documents are prepared correctly.
- Title service cost(s), paid by either party according to the contract but by default seller may pay the majority, for title search, title insurance, and possibly other title services. In some cases the attorney may do the title search or the title service and attorney fees may be combined. Required by institutional/commercial lenders and often by the real estate contract.
- Recording cost, paid by either party, charged by a governmental entity for entering an official record of the change of ownership of the property. Required by the government for recording the deed.
- Document or transaction stamps or taxes, paid by either or both parties depending on location (area of jurisdiction), charged by a governmental entity as an excise tax upon the transaction. Required by law.
- Survey fee for a survey of the lot or land and all structures on it, paid by either party, to confirm lot size and dimensions and check for encroachments. Required by institutional/commercial lenders.
- Brokerage commission, paid by the seller to a real estate broker, to compensate the broker(s) involved in the sale for their services in marketing the property, finding a buyer, and assisting in the negotiations. Brokerage commissions are usually computed as a percentage of the sale price, and are established in a listing agreement between the seller and the listing broker. The listing broker may offer buyer agents a portion of their commission as an incentive to find buyers for the property. Payment is required if real estate brokerage service was used. This is often one of the largest closing costs.
- Mortgage application fees, paid by the buyer to the lender, to cover the costs of processing their loan application. In some cases, the buyer would pay the lender the application directly and prior to closing, while in other cases the fee is part of the buyer's closing costs payable at closing.
- Points, paid by the buyer to the lender but may be reimbursed by the seller. Points are a form of pre-paid interest, charged by the lender as an alternative to charging a higher rate of interest on the mortgage loan. One point equals one percent of the loan principal, and usually reduces the interest rate by 1/8% (0.125).
- Appraisal fees, usually paid by the buyer (although occasionally by the seller through negotiation), charged by a licensed professional appraiser. Many lenders will require that an appraisal be performed as a condition of the mortgage loan. The purpose of this appraisal is to verify that the sale price of the property (upon which the underwriting of the loan is based) is equal to or less than the fair market value of the property.
- Inspection fees, usually paid by the buyer (although occasionally by the seller), charged by licensed home, pest, or other inspectors. Some lenders require inspections (such as termite inspection) to verify that the property is in good condition, which is necessary to assure that the property will retain the necessary collateral value to secure the mortgage loan. During a typical transaction in the United States, inspection fees are paid at time of service and not closing, however.
- Home warranties, paid by either the buyer or the seller. Warranties are available on resale homes insuring major household systems against repair or replacement for the buyer's initial year of ownership. Sellers will sometimes offer these warranties as a marketing strategy to give buyers "peace of mind", or buyers can elect to purchase them just prior to closing.
- Private mortgage insurance (PMI), paid by the buyer but may be reimbursed by the seller. Lenders will typically require that a mortgaged property be insured if the down payment is less than 20 percent, and will usually require that the first full year's mortgage insurance premium (MIP) be paid in advance by the buyer. If the buyer has not already paid the insurance company directly, this would become another closing cost payable at closing. The buyer can request cancellation of PMI once their equity reaches 20 percent of the market value, and the lenders are required to automatically cancel the PMI once the equity reaches 22 percent by federal laws.
- Pre-paid homeowner's property insurance, paid by the buyer in advance to protect the home against fire, earthquake, flood (normally a separate policy from other hazard insurance), theft, and other casualties. The lender will require this coverage. Flood insurance may or may not be required, depending on the location.
- Pro-rata property taxes, paid by the seller, the buyer, or both. Most (but not all) jurisdictions assess taxes on real property, which are usually payable at a specified date annually. Since all but a tiny fraction of real estate transactions close on a date other than this one specified annual date, most transactions must include an adjustment to assure that both the seller and the buyer end up paying their share of the annual property tax, proportionate to the percentage of the year that each has ownership of the property. Usually required by institutional/commercial lenders and by the real estate contract.
- Pro-rata homeowner association dues, paid by the seller, buyer, or both. If the property is covered by a homeowners association (HOA), the HOA will normally be funded by dues assessed against each property owner. Since the ownership of the seller and buyer are each fractional in the year of the transaction, there must be an adjustment made so that each owner pays their proportional share. Often required by institutional/commercial lenders and by the real estate contract.
- Pro-rata interest, paid by the buyer but may be reimbursed by the seller. The monthly mortgage payment is calculated and payable on a specified day each month. If the closing does not actually fall on that specified date (which is usually the case), then an adjustment must be made to calculate the interest on the loan for the number of extra days until the first payment is due.

Other items in addition to the above may be common in some jurisdictions, and some transactions may include unusual or unique items as closing costs. In the United States, federal law requires that all residential transactions financed by a mortgage have all closing costs documented in detail upon the standard HUD-1 form. This information must be provided to the principals but does not have to be sent to the government. Instead a declaration or statement by buyer and/or seller is often required to be provided to the government office recording the deed. Form 1099-S may be required to be sent to the United States Internal Revenue Service, but Federal law does not allow a charge for this.
