= Mortgage Conduct of Business rules =

The Mortgages and Home Finance: Conduct of Business Sourcebook (MCOB) governs the relationship in the United Kingdom between mortgage lenders and borrowers. They were first issued in October 2003 by The Financial Services Authority. They apply to Regulated Mortgage Contracts which are entered into on or after 31 October 2004. The Financial Services Authority became the Financial Conduct Authority in April 2013 with the MCOB continuing.

The task of the Mortgage Conduct of Business is consumer protection, industry stability, and healthy competition between financial service providers.

== Definitions ==
A 'Regulated Mortgage Contract' is a loan on the security of a first legal mortgage on land in the United Kingdom of which at least 40% is used as or in connection with a dwelling by the borrower. This loan can be to an individual or a trustee.

A credit agreement secured on land that is not a regulated mortgage contract, for example because the borrower is not an individual or a trustee, may be a regulated credit agreement to which the Consumer Credit Act 2006 (CCA) and Consumer Credit Sourcebook (CONC) apply.

The MCOB rules were designed to improve the information available to consumers and increase consumers' ability to make informed choices in the mortgage market.

== Regulations ==
They are a broad scheme of regulations covering:

- Mortgage selling
- Communication
- Financial promotion
- Conduct of advising and selling
- Disclosure of information
- Terms of offer documents
- Duty to treat customers fairly
- Duty to keep records
- Equity release schemes
- Arrears and repossessions
- Calculation of the annual percentage rate
- Calculation of total charge for credit
- Charges

The MCOB rules apply to every firm that carries on a home finance activity. A 'firm' may be a mortgage lender, administrator, arranger or adviser. A 'home finance activity' may be a regulated mortgage contract, a home purchase plan or a home reversion plan.

== Weblink ==
- Official website
