= Banking Code =

Code Of Practice Between Banks

The Banking Code was a voluntary code of practice agreed by banks in certain countries. The code typically described how banks dealt with accepting deposits and withdrawals and with customer disputes on transactions. Banking codes have in most countries been replaced by government imposed financial regulation governing banking practices.

== United Kingdom ==
On 1 November 2009 the Financial Services Authority (FSA) Banking Conduct Regime commenced. It applies to the regulated activity of accepting deposits, and replaces the non-lending aspects of the Banking Code and Business Banking Code (industry-owned codes that were monitored by the Banking Code Standards Board).

The Banking Code had also regulated legal liability of banks for disputed debit and credit card transactions. On 1 November 2009 it was superseded by the FSA Payment Services Regulations 2009, amongst other things making banks legally liable for transactions unless they could prove that customers had authorised them.

== Australia ==
The Banking Code of Practice is a set of enforceable standards that customers, small businesses, and their guarantors can expect from Australian banks first introduced in 1993. The Code is a set of promises outlining how a bank should conduct itself in its dealings with customers, as well as specific requirements for banking services. The Code provides safeguards and protections not set out in the law. It complements the law and, in some areas, sets higher standards than the law.

The code was developed by the Australian Banking Association and is independently reviewed every three years to ensure it remains relevant. In an Australian first, this voluntary Code has been considered and approved by the corporate regulator Australian Securities and Investments Commission under their industry code approval powers on 31 July 2018.

In the wake of Australia's Financial Services Royal Commission, Australia's Banks updated its Banking Code.

The voluntary code has been criticised for its Banking Code Compliance Committee not being fully independent in its oversight because its members will be appointed by banks. For the Code to be effective, some have argued that it should include basic tenets recommended by the Royal Commissioner in his interim report and to make it strictly liable in law and breaches criminal.

=== ePayments Code ===
Users of electronic payment facilities in Australia are protected by the ePayments Code. The ePayments Code, formerly known as the Electronic Funds Transfer Code of Conduct (EFT Code) which existed from 1986, applies to consumer electronic payment transactions, including ATM, EFTPOS and credit card transactions, online payments, internet and mobile banking, and BPAY. It complements other regulatory requirements, including financial services and consumer credit licensing, advice, training and disclosure obligations under the Corporations Act 2001 and the National Consumer Credit Protection Act 2009.

== See also ==
- Australian Banking Association
- British Bankers' Association
- Thinkmoney
