= Origination fee =

Fee associated with the taking of a loan

An origination fee or establishment fee is a payment charged for establishing a loan account with a bank, broker, or other financial service provider.

While origination fees can be a set amount, a tiered amount, or a percentage. Percentages typically range from 1.0% to 5.0% of the loan amount, varying based on whether the loan is in the prime or subprime market. For example, an origination fee of 5% on a $10,000 loan is $500. In the United States, Discount points are used to buy down the interest rates, temporarily or permanently. Origination fees and discount points are both items listed under lender-charges on the HUD-1 Settlement Statement. Regulation Z was enacted to protect borrowers from abusive lending practices. Under this regulation, origination fees for mortgages cannot be deducted from taxes.

== See also ==
- Bank fee
- Overdraft fee
