= Home equity loan =

Type of loan

A home equity loan is a type of loan in which the borrowers use the equity of their home as collateral. The loan amount is determined by the value of the property, and the value of the property is determined by an appraiser from the lending institution.

Home equity loans are often used to finance major expenses such as home repairs, medical bills, or college education. A home equity loan creates a lien against the borrower's house and reduces actual home equity.

Most home equity loans require good to excellent credit history, reasonable loan-to-value and combined loan-to-value ratios. Home equity loans come in two types: closed end (traditionally just called a home-equity loan) and open end (a/k/a a home equity line of credit (HELOC)). Both are usually referred to as second mortgages, because they are secured against the value of the property, just like a traditional mortgage.

Home equity loans and lines of credit are usually, but not always, for a shorter term than first mortgages. A home equity loan can be used as a person's main mortgage in place of a traditional mortgage. However, one cannot purchase a home using a home equity loan; one can only use a home equity loan to refinance. In the United States until December 31, 2017, it was possible to deduct home equity loan interest on one's personal income taxes. As part of the 2018 Tax Reform bill signed into law, interest on home equity loans will no longer be deductible on income taxes in the United States.

There is a specific difference between a home equity loan and a HELOC. A HELOC is a line of revolving credit with an adjustable interest rate, whereas a home equity loan is a one time lump-sum loan, often with a fixed interest rate. With a HELOC, the borrower can choose when and how often to borrow against the equity in the property, with the lender setting an initial limit to the credit line based on criteria similar to those used for closed-end loans. Like the closed-end loan, it may be possible to borrow up to an amount equal to the value of the home, minus any liens. These lines of credit are available up to 30 years, usually at a variable interest rate. The minimum monthly payment can be as low as only the interest that is due. Typically, the interest rate is based on the prime rate plus a margin.

== Fees ==
A brief list of fees that may apply for home equity loans:

- Appraisal fees
- Originator fees
- Title fees
- Stamp duties
- Arrangement fees
- Closing fees
- Early pay-off fee
- Inactivity fee
- Annual or Membership fee

Surveyor and conveyor or valuation fees may also apply to loans but some may be waived. The survey or conveyor and valuation costs can often be reduced, provided one finds a licensed surveyor to inspect the property considered for purchase. The title charges in secondary mortgages or equity loans are often fees for renewing the title information. Most loans will have fees of some sort.

== See also ==
- Home equity
- Home equity line of credit
- Home equity investments
- Mortgage equity withdrawal
- Reverse mortgage
