= Acuity Law =

Welsh law firm

Acuity Law is a legal practice founded in 1999 and headquarered in Cardiff, Wales. Its specialist areas of practice are property and infrastructure, and its clients have included the BBC Wales and His Majesty's Revenue and Customs It is based in Cardiff city centre. Its chairman has participated in round table discussions for Welsh Devolution.
