= Lump sum =

Single payment of money, as opposed to a series of payments made over time

A lump sum is a single payment of money, as opposed to a series of payments made over time (such as an annuity).

The United States Department of Housing and Urban Development distinguishes between "price analysis" and "cost analysis" by whether the decision maker compares lump sum amounts, or subjects contract prices to an itemized cost breakdown.

In 1911, American union leaders including Samuel Gompers of the American Federation of Labor expressed opposition to lump sums being awarded to their members pursuant to a new workers compensation law by saying that when they received lump sums rather than periodic payments, the risk of them squandering the money was greater.

The Financial Times reported in July 2011 that research by Prudential had found that 79% of polled pensioners in the UK collecting a company or private pension that year took a tax-free lump sum as part of their retirement benefits, as compared to 76% in 2008. Prudential was of the view that for many retirees, a lump sum at the time of retirement was the most tax efficient option. However, Prudential's head of business development, Vince Smith Hughes, said that "some pensioners are beginning to regret the way they used the tax-free cash. The days of buying a shiny new car or going on a once-in-a-lifetime holiday may be gone."

As an example, the Horizon Europe program uses lump sum as a mechanism to reduce amnistrative overhead when awarding research and innovation grants.

== See also ==
- Lump-sum tax
- Structured settlement
- Distortions (economics)
- Annuity
- Seller's points
