= Reverse mortgage =

Loan to homeowners without monthly payments

A reverse mortgage is a mortgage loan, usually secured by a residential property, that enables the borrower to access the unencumbered value of the property. The loans are typically promoted to older homeowners and typically do not require monthly mortgage payments. Borrowers are still responsible for property taxes or homeowner's insurance. Reverse mortgages allow older people to immediately access the equity they have built up in their homes, and defer payment of the loan until they die, sell, or move out of the home. Because there are no required mortgage payments on a reverse mortgage, the interest is added to the loan balance each month. The rising loan balance can eventually exceed the value of the home, particularly in times of declining home values or if the borrower continues to live in the home for many years. However, the borrower (or the borrower's estate) is generally not required to repay any additional loan balance in excess of the value of the home.

Regulators and academics have given mixed commentary on the reverse mortgage market. Some economists argue that reverse mortgages may benefit the elderly by smoothing out their income and consumption patterns over time. However, regulatory authorities, such as the Consumer Financial Protection Bureau, argue that reverse mortgages are "complex products and difficult for consumers to understand", especially in light of "misleading advertising", low-quality counseling, and "risk of fraud and other scams". Moreover, the Bureau claims that many consumers do not use reverse mortgages for the positive, consumption-smoothing purposes advanced by economists. In Canada, the borrower must seek independent legal advice before being approved for a reverse mortgage. In the United States, reverse mortgage borrowers, similarly to other mortgage borrowers, can face foreclosure if they do not maintain their homes or keep up to date on homeowner's insurance and property taxes.

== By country ==
=== Australia ===
==== Eligibility ====
Reverse mortgages are available in Australia. Under the Responsible Lending Laws, the National Consumer Credit Protection Act was amended in 2012 to incorporate a high level of regulation for reverse mortgages. Reverse mortgages are also regulated by the Australian Securities & Investments Commission (ASIC) requiring lenders and advisers to meet high compliance and disclosure requirements and advisers to all borrowers.

Borrowers should seek credit advice from an accredited reverse mortgage specialist before applying for a reverse mortgage. Anyone who wants to engage in credit activities (including lenders, lessors and brokers) must be licensed with ASIC or be a representative of someone who is licensed (that is, they must either have their own licence or come under the umbrella of another licensee as an authorised credit representative or employee) (ASIC)

Eligibility requirements vary by lender. To qualify for a reverse mortgage in Australia,

- The borrower must be above a certain age, usually 60 or 65; if the mortgage has more than one borrower, the youngest borrower must meet the age requirement
- The borrower must own the property, or the existing mortgage balance must be low enough that it will be extinguished by the reverse mortgage proceeds, thus leaving the reverse mortgage as the only debt that remains secured against the property.

==== Loan size and cost ====
Reverse mortgages in Australia can be as high as 50% of the property's value. The exact amount of money available (loan size) is determined by several factors:

- The borrower's age, with a higher amount available at a higher age
- Current interest rates
- Property value
- The location of the property
- Program minimum and maximum; for example, the loan might be constrained to a minimum of $10,000 and a maximum of between $250,000 and $1,000,000 depending on the lender.

The cost of getting a reverse mortgage depends on the particular reverse mortgage program the borrower obtains. These costs are frequently rolled into the loan itself and therefore compound with the principal. Typical costs for the reverse mortgage include:

- an application fee (establishment fee) = between $0 and $950
- stamp duty, mortgage registration fees, and other government charges = vary with location

The interest rate on the reverse mortgage varies. Some programs used to offer fixed rate loans, while others offer variable rate loans. Since the update of the National Consumer Credit Protection Act in September 2012, new reverse mortgage loans are not allowed to have fixed rates.

In addition, there may be costs during the life of the reverse mortgage. A monthly service charge may be applied to the balance of the loan (for example, $12 per month), which compounds with the principal. The best products have no monthly fees.

==== Proceeds from a reverse mortgage ====
The money from a reverse mortgage can be distributed in several different ways:

- As a lump sum, in cash, at settlement;
- As a tenure payment, a monthly cash payment;
- As a line of credit, similar to a home equity line of credit;
- As a combination of these.

==== Taxes and insurance ====
The borrower remains entirely responsible for the property. This includes physical maintenance. In addition, some programs require periodic reassessments of the value of the property.

Income from a reverse mortgage set up as an annuity or as a line of credit should not affect Government Income Support entitlements. However, income from a reverse mortgage set up as a lump sum could be considered a financial investment and thus deemed under the Income Test; this category includes all sums over $40,000 and sums under $40,000 that are not spent within 90 days.

==== When the loan comes due ====
Most reverse mortgages must be repaid (including all unpaid interest and fees) when they leave the home permanently. This includes when they sell the home or die. However, most reverse mortgages are owner-occupier loans only so that the borrower is not allowed to rent the property to a long-term tenant and move out. A borrower should check this if he thinks he wants to rent his property and move somewhere else.

A common misconception is that when the borrower dies or leaves the home (e.g., goes to an aged-care facility or moves somewhere else) the house must be sold. This is not the case; the loan must be repaid. Thus, the beneficiaries of the estate may decide to repay the reverse mortgage from other sources, sale of other assets, or even refinancing to a normal mortgage or, if they qualify, another reverse mortgage.

Prepayment of the loan—when the borrower pays the loan back before it reaches term—may incur penalties, depending on the loan. An additional fee could also be imposed in the event of a redraw. Under the National Credit Code, penalties for early repayment are illegal on new loans since September 2012; however, a bank may charge a reasonable administration fee for preparation of the discharge of mortgage.

All reverse mortgages written since September 2012 must have a "No Negative Equity Guarantee". This means that if the balance of the loan exceeds the proceeds of sale of the property, no claim for this excess will be made against the estate or other beneficiaries of the borrower.

On 18 September 2012, the government introduced statutory 'negative equity protection' on all new reverse mortgage contracts. This means the borrower cannot end up owing the lender more than their home is worth (the market value or equity). In a reverse mortgage begun before 18 September 2012, the contract specifies whether the borrower is protected when the loan balance ends up being more than the value of the property.

When the reverse mortgage contract ends and the borrower's home is sold, the lender will receive the proceeds of the sale and the borrower cannot be held liable for any debt in excess of this (except in certain circumstances, such as fraud or misrepresentation). Where the property sells for more than the amount owed to the lender, the borrower or his estate will receive the extra funds.

=== Canada ===
According to the October 2018 filings of the Office of the Superintendent of Financial Institutions (OSFI), an independent federal agency reporting to the Minister of Finance in that month, the outstanding reverse mortgage debt for Canadians soared to $CDN3.42 billion, setting a new record for both the monthly and the annual increases. Daniel Wong at Better Dwelling wrote that, the jump represented an 11.57% increase from September, which is the second biggest increase since 2010, 844% more than the median monthly pace of growth. The annual increase of 57.46% is 274% larger than the median annualized pace of growth.

Reverse mortgages in Canada are available through three financial institutions - Home Equity Bank, Equitable Bank and Bloom Financial. No reverse mortgages issued in Canada are insured by the government due to the nature of the product.

The cost of getting a reverse mortgage from a private sector lender may exceed the costs of other types of mortgage or equity conversion loans. Exact costs depend on the particular reverse mortgage program the borrower acquires and vary from lender to lender. Depending on the program, there may be other costs.

Money received in a reverse mortgage is still considered a loan and therefore is not taxable income. It therefore does not affect government benefits from Old Age Security (OAS) or Guaranteed Income Supplement (GIS).

The reverse mortgage comes due—the loan plus interest must be repaid—when the borrower dies, sells the property, or moves out of the house. Depending on the program, the reverse mortgage may be transferable to a different property if the owner moves. Prepayment of the loan—when the borrower pays the loan back before it reaches term—may incur penalties, depending on the program.

=== United States ===
The FHA-insured Home Equity Conversion Mortgage, or HECM, was signed into law on February 5, 1988, by President Ronald Reagan as part of the Housing and Community Development Act of 1987. The first HECM was given to Marjorie Mason of Fairway, Kansas, in 1989 by James B. Nutter and Company.

In the United States, the FHA-insured HECM (home equity conversion mortgage), a.k.a. reverse mortgage, is a non-recourse loan. In simple terms, the borrowers are not responsible to repay any loan balance that exceeds the net-sales proceeds of their home. For example, if the last borrower left the home and the loan balance on their FHA-insured reverse mortgage was $125,000, and the home sold for $100,000, neither the borrower nor their heirs would be responsible for the $25,000 on the reverse mortgage loan that exceeded the value of their home. The extra $25,000 would be paid from the FHA insurance that was purchased when the HECM loan was originated. A reverse mortgage cannot go upside down. The cost of the FHA mortgage insurance is a one-time fee of 2% of the appraised value of the home, and an annual fee of 0.5% of the outstanding loan balance.

According to a 2015 article in the Journal of Urban Economics, about 12% of the United States HECM reverse mortgage borrowers defaulted on "their property taxes or homeowners insurance"—a "relatively high default rate". However, the data was derived from participants during 2006–2011 and compared them to homeowners with forward mortgages and not homeowners without a mortgage. This research caused a reform in reverse mortgages in 2013: homeowners could only withdraw 60% of their available proceeds in the first year. The retired population normally does not have the same level of income to afford increases in taxes and insurance as individuals with a traditional mortgage. In the United States, reverse mortgage borrowers as well as any homeowner can face foreclosure if they do not maintain their homes or keep up to date on homeowner's insurance and property taxes. The FBI, Inspector General, and HUD urge American consumers, especially senior citizens, to be cautious when considering reverse mortgages to avoid scams. HUD specifically warns consumers to "beware of scam artists that charge thousands of dollars for information that is free from HUD".

In a 2018 study, reverse mortgage borrowers have significantly higher financial and housing satisfaction compared to nonborrowers. Reverse mortgages received fewer complaints than any other mortgage product. Among a total of 32,000 consumer complaints received by the Consumer Financial Protection Bureau (CFPB) in 2021, only approximately 300 of those complaints — under 1% — had to do with reverse mortgage loans.

==== Eligibility ====
To qualify for the HECM reverse mortgage in the United States, borrowers generally must be at least 62 years of age and the home must be their primary residence (second homes and investment properties do not qualify).

On April 25, 2014, FHA revised the HECM age eligibility requirements to extend certain protections to spouses younger than age 62. Under the old guidelines, the reverse mortgage could only be written for the spouse who was 62 or older. If the older spouse died, the reverse mortgage balance became due and payable if the younger surviving spouse was left off of the HECM loan. If this younger spouse was unable to pay off or refinance the reverse mortgage balance, he or she was forced either to sell the home or lose it to foreclosure. This often created a significant hardship for spouses of deceased HECM mortgagors, so FHA revised the eligibility requirements in Mortgagee Letter 2014-07. Under the new guidelines, spouses who are younger than age 62 at the time of origination retain the protections offered by the HECM program if the older spouse who got the mortgage dies. This means that the surviving spouse can remain living in the home without having to repay the reverse mortgage balance as long as he or she keeps up with property taxes and homeowner's insurance and maintains the home to a reasonable level.

For a reverse mortgage to be a viable financial option, existing mortgage balances usually must be low enough to be paid off with the reverse mortgage proceeds. However, borrowers do have the option of paying down their existing mortgage balance to qualify for a HECM reverse mortgage.

The HECM reverse mortgage follows the standard FHA eligibility requirements for property type, meaning most 1–4 family dwellings, FHA-approved condominiums, and PUDs qualify. Manufactured homes also qualify as long as they meet FHA standards.

Before starting the loan process for an FHA/HUD-approved reverse mortgage, applicants must take an approved counseling course. An approved counselor should help explain how reverse mortgages work, the financial and tax implications of taking out a reverse mortgage, payment options, and costs associated with a reverse mortgage. The counseling is meant to protect borrowers, although the quality of counseling has been criticized by groups such as the Consumer Financial Protection Bureau.

In a 2010 survey of elderly Americans, 48% of respondents cited financial difficulties as the primary reason for obtaining a reverse mortgage and 81% stated a desire to remain in their current homes until death.

==== Amount of proceeds available ====
The total pool of money that a borrower can receive from a HECM reverse mortgage is called the principal limit (PL), which is calculated based on the maximum claim amount (MCA), the age of the youngest borrower, the expected interest rate (EIR), and a table to PL factors published by HUD. Similar to loan-to-value (LTV) in the forward mortgage world, the principal limit is essentially the percentage of the value of the home that can be lent under the FHA HECM guidelines. Most PLs are typically in the range of 50% to 60% of the MCA, but they can sometimes be higher or lower. The table below gives examples of principal limits for various ages and EIRs and a property value of $250,000.

==== Options for distribution of proceeds ====
The money from a reverse mortgage can be distributed in four ways, based on the borrower's financial needs and goals:

- Lump sum in cash at settlement
- Monthly payment (loan advance) for a set number of years (term) or life (tenure)
- Line of credit (similar to a home equity line of credit)
- Some combination of the above

The adjustable-rate HECM offers all of the above payment options, but the fixed-rate HECM only offers lump sum.

The line of credit option accrues growth, meaning that whatever is available and unused on the line of credit will automatically grow larger at a compounding rate. This means that borrowers who opt for a HECM line of credit can potentially gain access to more cash over time than what they initially qualified for at origination.

The line of credit growth rate is determined by adding 1.25% to the initial interest rate (IIR), which means the line of credit will grow faster if the interest rate on the loan increases.

On 3 September 2013 HUD implemented Mortgagee Letter 2013-27, which made significant changes to the amount of proceeds that can be distributed within the first year of the loan. Because many borrowers were taking full draw lump sums (often at the encouragement of lenders) at closing and burning through the money quickly, HUD sought to protect borrowers and the viability of the HECM program by limiting the amount of proceeds that can be accessed within the first 12 months of the loan.

If the total mandatory obligations (which includes existing mortgage balances, all closing costs, delinquent federal debts, and purchase transaction costs) to be paid by the reverse mortgage are less than 60% of the principal limit, then the borrower can draw additional proceeds up to 60% of the principal limit in the first 12 months. Any remaining available proceeds can be accessed after 12 months.

If the total mandatory obligations exceed 60% of the principal limit, then the borrower can draw an additional 10% of the principal limit if available.

==== HECM for purchase ====
The Housing and Economic Recovery Act of 2008 provided HECM mortgagors with the opportunity to purchase a new principal residence with HECM loan proceeds — the so-called HECM for Purchase program, effective January 2009. The "HECM for Purchase" applies if "the borrower is able to pay the difference between the HECM and the sales price and closing costs for the property. The program was designed to allow the elderly to purchase a new principal residence and obtain a reverse mortgage within a single transaction by eliminating the need for a second closing. Texas was the last state to allow for reverse mortgages for purchase.

==== Taxes and insurance ====
Unlike traditional forward mortgages, there are no escrow accounts in the reverse mortgage world. Property taxes and homeowners insurance are paid by the homeowner on their own, which is a requirement of the HECM program (along with the payment of other property charges such as HOA dues).

===== Life expectancy set aside (LESA) =====
If a reverse mortgage applicant fails to meet the satisfactory credit or residual income standards required under the new financial assessment guidelines implemented by FHA on March 2, 2015, the lender may require a Life Expectancy Set Aside, or LESA. A LESA carves out a portion of the reverse mortgage benefit amount for the payment of property taxes and insurance for the borrower's expected remaining life span. FHA implemented the LESA to reduce defaults based on the nonpayment of property taxes and insurance.

==== Taxability of HECM proceeds ====
The American Bar Association guide advises that generally,

- The Internal Revenue Service does not consider loan advances to be income.
- Annuity advances may be partially taxable.
- Interest charged is not deductible until it is actually paid, that is, at the end of the loan.
- The mortgage insurance premium is deductible on the 1040 long form.
- The money used from a reverse mortgage is not taxable.

The money received from a reverse mortgage is considered a loan advance. It therefore is not taxable and does not directly affect Social Security or Medicare benefits. However, an American Bar Association guide to reverse mortgages explains that if borrowers receive Medicaid, SSI, or other public benefits, loan advances will be counted as "liquid assets" if the money is kept in an account (savings, checking, etc.) past the end of the calendar month in which it is received; the borrower could lose eligibility for such public programs if total liquid assets (cash, generally) is then greater than those programs allow.

==== When the loan comes due ====
The HECM reverse mortgage is not due and payable until the last borrower (or non-borrowing spouse) dies, sells the house, or fails to live in the home for a period greater than 12 months. The loan may also become due and payable if the borrower fails to pay property taxes or homeowners insurance, lets the condition of the home significantly deteriorate, or transfers the title of the property to a non-borrower (excluding trusts that meet HUD's requirements).

==== Volume of loans ====
Home Equity Conversion Mortgages account for 90% of all reverse mortgages originated in the U.S. As of May 2010, there were 493,815 active HECM loans. As of 2006, the number of HECM mortgages that HUD is authorized to insure under the reverse mortgage law was capped at 275,000. However, through the annual appropriations acts, Congress has temporarily extended HUD's authority to insure HECMs notwithstanding the statutory limits.

Program growth in recent years has been very rapid. In fiscal year 2001, 7,781 HECM loans were originated. By the fiscal year ending in September 2008, the annual volume of HECM loans topped 112,000 representing a 1,300% increase in six years. For the fiscal year ending September 2011, loan volume had contracted in the wake of the financial crisis, but remained at over 73,000 loans that were originated and insured through the HECM program.

Since the HECM program was created, analysts have expected loan volume to grow further as the U.S. population ages. In 2000, the Census Bureau estimated that 34 million of the country's 270 million residents were sixty-five years of age or older, while projecting the two totals to rise to 62 and 337 million, respectively, in 2025. In addition, the Center For Retirement Research at Boston College estimates that more than half of retirees "may be unable to maintain their standard of living in retirement." The low adoption rates can be partially explained by dysfunctional aspects of the reverse mortgage market, including high markups, complexity of the product, consumer distrust of reverse mortgage lenders, and lack of pricing transparency.

=== Hong Kong ===
Hong Kong Mortgage Corporation (HKMC), a government sponsored entity similar to that of Fannie Mae and Freddie Mac in the US, provides credit enhancement service to commercial banks that originate reverse mortgage. Besides providing liquidity to the banks by securitization, HKMC can offer guarantee of reverse mortgage principals up to a certain percentage of the loan value. As of 2016, reverse mortgage is available to house-owners aged 55 or above from 10 different banks. Applicants can also boost the loan value by pledging their in-the-money life insurance policies to the bank. In terms of the use of proceed, applicants are allowed to make one-off withdrawal to pay for property maintenance, medical and legal costs, in addition to the monthly payout.

=== Taiwan ===
A trial program for reverse mortgages was launched in 2013 by the Financial Supervisory Commission, Ministry of the Interior. Taiwan Cooperative Bank was the first bank to offer such a product. As of June 2017, reverse mortgages are available from a total of 10 financial institutions. However, social stigma associated with not preserving real estate for inheritance has prevented reverse mortgages from widespread adoption.

== Use of housing wealth in middle-market retirement planning ==
Financial planners and retirement researchers have increasingly examined the role of home equity as a potential source of retirement income, particularly for middle-market households who may have limited investable assets but substantial housing wealth. In an analysis published in Retirement Insight, Mary Jo Lafaye, mutual of Omaha Reverse Mortgage Specialist in California, discusses how reverse mortgages can function as a flexible tool for improving retirement security among this demographic. Her work highlights that many middle-income retirees face gaps in guaranteed income and liquid savings, making coordinated use of home equity an important, and sometimes underutilized, strategy.

Lafaye’s review emphasizes several key considerations: the importance of integrating housing wealth into broader retirement-income planning, the potential benefits of using a reverse mortgage line of credit to manage sequence-of-returns risk, and the role of home equity in supporting long-term aging-in-place goals. She notes that when used prudently, reverse mortgages may help retirees reduce portfolio withdrawal pressures, supplement Social Security income, or cover health-related expenses in later life.

Lafaye's perspective contributes to a broader body of research suggesting that reverse mortgages are evolving from a last-resort option to a more mainstream retirement-planning tool when evaluated within a holistic financial framework.

== Criticism ==
Reverse mortgages have been criticized for several major shortcomings:

- Possible high up-front costs make reverse mortgages expensive. In the United States, entering a reverse mortgage will cost approximately the same as a traditional FHA mortgage, depending on the loan-to-value ratio.
- The interest rate on a reverse mortgage may be higher than on a conventional "forward mortgage".
- Interest compounds over the life of a reverse mortgage, which means that "the mortgage can quickly balloon". Since no monthly payments are made by the borrower on a reverse mortgage, the interest that accrues is treated as a loan advance. Each month, interest is calculated not only on the principal amount received by the borrower, but on the interest previously assessed to the loan. Because of this compound interest, as a reverse mortgage's length grows, it becomes more likely to deplete the entire equity of the property. However, with an FHA-insured HECM reverse mortgage obtained in the United States or any reverse mortgage obtained in Canada, the borrower can never owe more than the value of the property and cannot pass on any debt from the reverse mortgage to any heirs. The sole remedy the lender has is the collateral, not assets in the estate, if applicable.
- Reverse mortgages can be confusing; many obtain them without fully understanding the terms and conditions, and a 2012 U.S. report suggests that some lenders have sought to take advantage of this complexity to offer contracts that disadvantage homeowners. A majority of respondents to a 2000 survey of elderly Americans failed to understand the financial terms of reverse mortgages very well when securing their reverse mortgages. "In the past, government investigations and consumer advocacy groups raised significant consumer protection concerns about the business practices of reverse mortgage lenders and other companies in the reverse mortgage industry." In a 2006 survey of borrowers by AARP, ninety-three percent said their reverse mortgage had a mostly positive effect on their lives, compared with three percent who said the effect was mostly negative. Some ninety-three percent of borrowers reported that they were satisfied with their experiences with lenders, and ninety-five percent reported that they were satisfied with the counselors that they were required to see.

== See also ==
- Compare reverse mortgage with home equity loan and home equity line of credit.
- Estate planning
- Elder financial abuse
- Negative amortization
- Bankruptcy
- Equity release, the United Kingdom equivalent
- Yung-Ping Chen#Home-equity conversion (reverse mortgage)
- Life estate
