= Home equity line of credit =

Type of loan in which the borrower uses a home as collateral

A home equity line of credit (HELOC; /ˈhe̞ːˌlɒk/ HEE-lok) is a revolving type of secured loan in which the lender agrees to lend a maximum amount within an agreed period (called a term), where the collateral is the borrower's property (akin to a second mortgage). Because a home often is a consumer's most valuable asset, many homeowners use their HELOC for major purchases or projects, such as home improvements, education, property investment or medical bills, and choose not to use them for day-to-day expenses.

A reason for the popularity of HELOCs is their flexibility, both in terms of borrowing and repaying. Furthermore, their popularity may also stem from having a better image than a "second mortgage", a term which can more directly imply an undesirable level of debt. However, within the lending industry itself, HELOCs are categorized as a second mortgage. HELOCs are usually offered at attractive interest rates. This is because they are secured against a borrower’s home and thus seen as low-risk financial products.

However, because the collateral of a HELOC is the home, failure to repay the loan or meet loan requirements may result in foreclosure. As a result, lenders generally require that the borrower maintain a certain level of equity in the home as a condition of providing a home equity line, usually a minimum of 15-20%.

== Differences from conventional loans ==
A HELOC differs from a conventional home equity loan in that the borrower is not advanced the entire sum up front, but uses a line of credit to borrow sums that total no more than the credit limit, similar to a credit card.

The term of a HELOC is split in two distinct periods. During the “draw period”, the customer can use their HELOC like a revolving facility. Draw periods typically last 10 years. During this time, the borrower can drawdown funds, repay and redraw again as many times as they wish, only paying interest on their outstanding balance. The draw period is followed by the “repayment period” where the outstanding balance plus interest is due, either as a lump-sum balloon payment or according to a loan amortization schedule.

Early repayment can usually be made at any time in the term and are either capital and interest or interest only (“minimum payment”). Repayment amount can range from the minimum payment to the full drawn amount plus interest. Lenders determine the amount they can lend to a borrower based on two variables: 1) the value of the security property and 2) the borrower’s creditworthiness. This is expressed in a combined loan-to-value (CLTV) ratio.

== History of HELOCs ==
=== United States ===
HELOCs became very popular in the United States in the early 2000s, in part because banks were using ad campaigns to encourage customers to take out home loans, and because interest paid was typically deductible under federal and many state income tax laws. This effectively reduced the cost of borrowing funds and offered an attractive tax incentive over traditional methods of borrowing such as credit cards. Whereas most mortgages are offered at fixed rates, HELOCs are usually offered at variable rates due to the flexibility embedded into a 10-year draw period where interest rates may change.

HELOC abuse is often cited as one cause of the subprime mortgage crisis in the United States. In 2008 major home equity lenders including Bank of America, Countrywide Financial, Citigroup, JP Morgan Chase, National City Mortgage, Washington Mutual and Wells Fargo began informing borrowers that their home equity lines of credit had been frozen, reduced, suspended, rescinded or restricted in some other manner. Falling housing prices have led to borrowers possessing reduced equity, which was perceived as an increased risk of foreclosure in the eyes of lenders.

After Tax Cuts and Jobs Act of 2017, interest on a HELOC is no longer deductible unless the loan is used for substantial home improvement. JPMorgan Chase paused consideration of applications for HELOCs in 2020, only resuming in late 2025 once both interest rates and home prices had recovered.

=== Canada ===
Similarly to the US, the HELOC market in Canada grew by 20% a year in the early 2000s, representing $35 billion in 2000 to approximately $186 billion in 2012. Looking at non-mortgage consumer debt, the share of HELOCs grew from 10% to 40% in that time. To put this breakthrough into perspective, credit cards consistently represented around 15% of the market share through this period. The main drivers for this evolving market were low-interest rates and sustained rising property prices. Both conditions were favourable to customers, as the growing equity in their properties represented an excellent opportunity to secure larger and longer loans.

In the aftermath of the 2008 crisis, demand for HELOCs stabilized and grew by an average of 2% yearly. This slower growth could be attributed to a lower demand, exceptionally low rates on mortgages and a more regulated market. Indeed, the recession has pushed the Canadian government to take measures aimed at mitigating the risks associated with taking a HELOC. Some of these measures may have impacted the growth of the HELOC market, limiting the demand on the customer side and making lending criteria tighter.

A 2011 decision to make HELOCs ineligible for government-backed “portfolio insurance” was one of them. This insurance was used by lenders to “securitize pooled mortgages through the National Housing Act Mortgage-Backed Securities (NHA MBS) program”. Another measure was the Office of the Superintendent of Financial Institutions (OSFI) decision to cap the maximum LTV ratio for HELOCs at 65%, thus limiting the amounts homeowners could leverage from their property. Underwriting rules were also made stricter through the Residential Mortgage Underwriting Practices and Procedures Guideline.

=== United Kingdom ===
Despite the proliferation of HELOC products in the US and Canada, the UK market did not have a similar product offering pre-2021. This is significant as the UK market has historically replicated innovative financial products developed in the US, such as credit cards or online payments. This can be partly attributed to the fact that the UK banking system is highly consolidated with little product innovation among the major lenders. This changed in the post-pandemic context, where innovation in the financial services industry has accelerated, with ‘fintechs’ introducing new products to the market.

The first UK HELOC product was in 2021, by the fintech Selina Finance. As of 2022, despite less than 5% per capita utilisation of HELOC products compared to mature, established markets such as the US and Canada, UK customers have shown increasing tendency to use HELOC products as a substitute to existing consumer finance tools. As a result, annual HELOC originations have increased fivefold, from $50m in 2021 to $250m in 2022.

In the UK however, offset mortgages have been common for many years, which is a primary form of lending against a property. The current companies that provide these products are Yorkshire Building Society, Coverntry Building Society, Clydesdale Bank & Accord Mortgages.

=== Brazil ===
In spite of high interest rates for consumers in Brazil, which are historically among the highest in the world, often above 200% per year, and in some cases, surpassing 430% per year for revolving credit card debt, home equity line of credit (HELOC) were not offered in the country prior to 2023. In 2022, almost 80% of Brazilian families ended the year in debt (generally with very expensive rates), a record since the CNC - National Confederation of Commerce - began researching the subject in 2011. The first Brazilian company offering a HELOC product was authorized to operate by the Central Bank of Brazil in June 2023. It was the fintech ZiliCred (trading name) / All In Cred (company name).

ZiliCred estimates that the market potential of home equity line of credit (HELOC) in Brazil represents something like 12% of operations linked to property guarantees, which represents around BRL 420 billion. ZiliCred HELOC closing costs are around CDI rate plus a flat rate (0.99% to 1.99%) per month, which represents average savings around 95% when compared to interest rates from other revolving credit lines. ZiliCred offers a fee free option when HELOC is contracted directly with the Company.

The introduction of HELOC in Brazil is a noteworthy development in the country's financial landscape. It can enhance financial flexibility, reduce borrowing costs, and provide homeowners with a valuable tool to manage their finances more effectively. This empowerment can lead to better financial decision-making, reduced reliance on high-cost consumer debt, and ultimately a higher quality of life for many individuals.
