= HUD-1 Settlement Statement =

Mortgage lending form

HUD-1 Settlement Statement

The HUD-1 Settlement Statement is a standardized mortgage lending form in use in the United States of America on which creditors or their closing agents itemize all charges imposed on buyers and sellers in consumer credit mortgage transactions. The HUD-1 (or a similar variant called the HUD-1A) is used primarily for reverse mortgages and mortgage refinance transactions. The reference to 'HUD' in the form's name refers to the Department of Housing and Urban Development.

Federal regulations require that unless its use is specifically exempted, either the HUD-1 or the HUD-1A, as appropriate, must be used for all mortgage transactions that are subject to the Real Estate Settlement Procedures Act. Prior to October 3, 2015, the form was used in closed-end consumer credit transactions that were secured by real property or cooperative units. But as of that date, the TILA/RESPA integrated disclosure (TRID) rule issued by the Consumer Financial Protection Bureau established a specific HUD-1/HUD-1A exemption. The TRID rule mandates the use of a Closing Disclosure form instead. The use of the HUD-1 or HUD-1A is also exempted for open-end lines of credit (home-equity plans) covered by the Truth in Lending Act and Regulation Z.

A HUD-1 or HUD-1A Settlement Statement is prepared by a creditor or, more typically, by the settlement agent who conducts the closing on the creditor's behalf. The settlement agent must permit the borrower to inspect the HUD-1 or HUD-1A settlement statement, completed to set forth those items that are known to the settlement agent at the time of inspection, during the business day immediately preceding settlement. Items related only to the seller's transaction may be omitted from the HUD-1.
