= Annuity (disambiguation) =

An annuity is a financial contract guaranteeing a series of regular payments made at equal intervals over a fixed period of time.

It may also refer to:

- Life annuity, an annuity in which the term is a person's lifetime
- Perpetuity, or perpetual annuity, an annuity from which payments continue indefinitely

== See also ==
- Annuities under American law
- Annuities under European law
- Annuities under Swiss law
