= Omo =

Omo or OMO may refer to:

== Geography ==
=== Ethiopia ===
- Omo River (Ethiopia), in southern Ethiopia is the largest Ethiopian river outside the Nile Basin and namesake for all the topics below
- Omo Nada, one of the woredas in the Oromia Region of Ethiopia
- South Omo Zone, a zone in the Ethiopian Southern Nations, Nationalities and Peoples' Region (SNNPR)
- Omo National Park, Ethiopia
- Omo Kibish Formation, an East African rock formation
- Omo remains, a collection of hominid bones

=== Elsewhere ===
- Omø, an island in Denmark
- Omo River (Quebec), a tributary of Maicasagi River in Quebec, Canada

== People ==
- Omo Aikeremiokha, (born 2005), British trampoline gymnast
- Omo Osaghae (born 1988), American hurdler
- Suleiman Omo (born 1985), Nigerian footballer for clubs in southeastern Europe

== Acronyms and codes ==
- Open market operation, by the Federal Reserve or other central banks
- Open Market Option allows someone approaching retirement to ‘shop around’
- One-man operation (OMO), a bus or tram on which the driver collects the fares
- Oracle Media Objects a software development application.
- Ontario Mathematics Olympiad
- Mostar Airport, Bosnia and Herzegovina, IATA code OMO

== Other uses ==
- Omo (detergent), a detergent product
- Omo sebua, a traditional house style of the Nias people of Indonesia
- Omo tuo, a Ghanaian staple food made with rice
- Omo-, a prefix for the scapula
- Omorashi, bladder incontinence fetishism

== See also ==
- Ommo (disambiguation)
- Omon (disambiguation)
- Omos, professional wrestler (WWE)
- Omos, fictional star and solar system introduced in Edgar Rice Burroughs' Adventure on Poloda 1942
