= Value of money =

Value of money may refer to:

- Time value of money
- Present value
- Value (economics),
- Value for Money, a 1955 British comedy film directed by Ken Annakin and starring John Gregson
- Time value of money, purchasing power of money as it varies over time
