= Limited price indexation =

Index used in setting UK pension payments

Limited price indexation (LPI) is a pricing index used to calculate increases in components of scheme pension payments in the United Kingdom. In the UK, the statutory minimum increases for defined benefit scheme pensions in payment are linked to price inflation as measured for statutory purposes by the Consumer Prices Index (CPI) since 2011, subject to LPI caps: up to 5% a year for rights accrued between 6 April 1997 and 5 April 2005, and up to 2.5% a year for rights accrued from 6 April 2005 onwards; there is no statutory requirement to index rights accrued before April 1997.

Schemes may provide higher increases under their rules (and some benefits may still reference RPI in scheme documentation), but the statutory minimum is CPI-based and subject to the 5%/2.5% LPI caps by accrual period.

In April 2011, the index used for limited price indexation (LPI) in UK occupational pension schemes was switched from the Retail Prices Index (RPI) to the Consumer Prices Index (CPI). The Government’s announcement clarified that:

- the statutory requirement would apply to rights that members had already accrued, not only to future service rights;
- members already in receipt of pensions would remain entitled to increases that had been granted, although future increases on the entire pension could be calculated using CPI rather than RPI; and
- pension schemes retained the discretion to provide higher increases if desired.

The rate of revaluation for deferred pensions was amended on the same basis, with any revaluation already granted under RPI remaining protected.

== Usage ==
The Pensions Act 1995 required scheme pension payments arising from excess contributions to go up at the LPI. Excess contributions are defined as contributions that are not protected rights contributions from contracting out of State Earnings-Related Pension Scheme (SERPS) or the State second pension (S2P) or any Additional voluntary contributions (AVCs). Only contributions made after 6 April 1997 are required to increase at the LPI rate, so these contributions are known as post 1997 excess contributions.↵The rules were later amended by the Pensions Act 2004 so that excess contributions made after 6 April 2005 only had to increase at the RPI rate capped at 2.5% instead of 5%. In either case, the scheme can pay increases greater than the statutory minimum. The rules for payment increases only apply to scheme pensions, i.e. pension payments made from a defined benefits (DB or final salary) scheme. Payments arising from contributions into a money purchase pension scheme (also known as a defined contribution pension scheme) are not required to increase. This is because scheme members have the right to use their fund value to purchase an annuity with their own chosen rate of increase, which could be zero if a level pension is chosen. This right is known as the open market option. Following A-day, members also have the right to enter into an unsecured pension arrangement.
