= Present value =

Current worth of a future sum discounted to today

In economics and finance, present value (PV), also known as present discounted value (PDV), is the value of an expected income stream determined as of the date of valuation. The present value is usually less than the future value because money has interest-earning potential, a characteristic referred to as the time value of money, except during times of negative interest rates, when the present value will be equal or more than the future value. Time value can be described with the simplified phrase, "A dollar today is worth more than a dollar tomorrow". Here, 'worth more' means that its value is greater than tomorrow. A dollar today is worth more than a dollar tomorrow because the dollar can be invested and earn a day's worth of interest, making the total accumulate to a value more than a dollar by tomorrow. Interest can be compared to rent. Just as rent is paid to a landlord by a tenant without the ownership of the asset being transferred, interest is paid to a lender by a borrower who gains access to the money for a time before paying it back. By letting the borrower have access to the money, the lender has sacrificed the exchange value of this money, and is compensated for it in the form of interest. The initial amount of borrowed funds (the present value) is less than the total amount of money paid to the lender.

Present value calculations, and similarly future value calculations, are used to value loans, mortgages, annuities, sinking funds, perpetuities, bonds, and more. These calculations are used to make comparisons between cash flows that don't occur at simultaneous times, since time and dates must be consistent in order to make comparisons between values. When deciding between projects in which to invest, the choice can be made by comparing respective present values of such projects by means of discounting the expected income streams at the corresponding project interest rate, or rate of return. The project with the highest present value, i.e. that is most valuable today, should be chosen.

== Background ==
If offered a choice between $100 today or $100 in one year, and there is a positive real interest rate throughout the year, a rational person will choose $100 today. This is described by economists as time preference. Time preference can be measured by auctioning off a risk free security—like a US Treasury bill. If a $100 note with a zero coupon, payable in one year, sells for $80 now, then $80 is the present value of the note that will be worth $100 a year from now. This is because money can be put in a bank account or any other (safe) investment that will return interest in the future.

An investor who has some money has two options: to spend it right now or to save it. But the financial compensation for saving it (and not spending it) is that the money value will accrue through the compound interest that he or she will receive from a borrower (the bank account in which he has the money deposited).

Therefore, to evaluate the real value of an amount of money today after a given period of time, economic agents compound the amount of money at a given (interest) rate. Most actuarial calculations use the risk-free interest rate which corresponds to the minimum guaranteed rate provided by a bank's saving account for example, assuming no risk of default by the bank to return the money to the account holder on time. To compare the change in purchasing power, the real interest rate (nominal interest rate minus inflation rate) should be used.

The operation of evaluating a present value into the future value is called a capitalization (how much will $100 today be worth in 5 years?). The reverse operation—evaluating the present value of a future amount of money—is called a discounting (how much will $100 received in 5 years—at a lottery for example—be worth today?).

It follows that if one has to choose between receiving $100 today and $100 in one year, the rational decision is to choose the $100 today. If the money is to be received in one year and assuming the savings account interest rate is 5%, the person has to be offered at least $105 in one year so that the two options are equivalent (either receiving $100 today or receiving $105 in one year). This is because if $100 is deposited in a savings account, the value will be $105 after one year, again assuming no risk of losing the initial amount through bank default.

== Interest rates ==
Interest is the additional amount of money gained between the beginning and the end of a time period. Interest represents the time value of money, and can be thought of as rent that is required of a borrower in order to use money from a lender. For example, when an individual takes out a bank loan, the individual is charged interest. Alternatively, when an individual deposits money into a bank, the money earns interest. In this case, the bank is the borrower of the funds and is responsible for crediting interest to the account holder. Similarly, when an individual invests in a company (through corporate bonds, or through stock), the company is borrowing funds, and must pay interest to the individual (in the form of coupon payments, dividends, or stock price appreciation). The interest rate is the change, expressed as a percentage, in the amount of money during one compounding period. A compounding period is the length of time that must transpire before interest is credited, or added to the total. For example, interest that is compounded annually is credited once a year, and the compounding period is one year. Interest that is compounded quarterly is credited four times a year, and the compounding period is three months. A compounding period can be any length of time, but some common periods are annually, semiannually, quarterly, monthly, daily, and even continuously.

There are several types and terms associated with interest rates:

- Compound interest, interest that increases exponentially over subsequent periods,
- Simple interest, additive interest that does not increase
- Effective interest rate, the effective equivalent compared to multiple compound interest periods
- Nominal annual interest, the simple annual interest rate of multiple interest periods
- Discount rate, an inverse interest rate when performing calculations in reverse
- Continuously compounded interest, the mathematical limit of an interest rate with a period of zero time.
- Real interest rate, which accounts for inflation.

== Calculation ==
The operation of evaluating a present sum of money some time in the future is called a capitalization (how much will 100 today be worth in five years?). The reverse operation—evaluating the present value of a future amount of money—is called discounting (how much will 100 received in five years be worth today?).

Spreadsheets commonly offer functions to compute present value. In Microsoft Excel, there are present value functions for single payments - "=NPV(...)", and series of equal, periodic payments - "=PV(...)". Programs will calculate present value flexibly for any cash flow and interest rate, or for a schedule of different interest rates at different times.

=== Present value of a lump sum ===
The most commonly applied model of present valuation uses compound interest. The standard formula is:

$$PV = \frac{C}{(1+i)^n} \,$$

Where $\,C\,$ is the future amount of money that must be discounted, $\,n\,$ is the number of compounding periods between the present date and the date where the sum is worth $\,C\,$, $\,i\,$ is the interest rate for one compounding period (the end of a compounding period is when interest is applied, for example, annually, semiannually, quarterly, monthly, daily). The interest rate, $\,i\,$, is given as a percentage, but expressed as a decimal in this formula.

Often, $v^{n} = \,(1 + i)^{-n}$ is referred to as the Present Value Factor

This is also found from the formula for the future value with negative time.

For example, if you are to receive $1000 in five years, and the effective annual interest rate during this period is 10% (or 0.10), then the present value of this amount is

$$PV = \frac{\$1000}{(1+0.10)^{5}} = \$620.92 \,$$

The interpretation is that for an effective annual interest rate of 10%, an individual would be indifferent to receiving $1000 in five years, or $620.92 today.

The purchasing power in today's money of an amount $\,C\,$ of money, $\,n\,$ years into the future, can be computed with the same formula, where in this case $\,i\,$ is an assumed future inflation rate.

If we are using lower discount rate(i ), then it allows the present values in the discount future to have higher values.

=== Net present value of a stream of cash flows ===
A cash flow is an amount of money that is either paid out or received, differentiated by a negative or positive sign, at the end of a period. Conventionally, cash flows that are received are denoted with a positive sign (total cash has increased) and cash flows that are paid out are denoted with a negative sign (total cash has decreased). The cash flow for a period represents the net change in money of that period. Calculating the net present value, $\,NPV\,$, of a stream of cash flows consists of discounting each cash flow to the present, using the present value factor and the appropriate number of compounding periods, and combining these values.

For example, if a stream of cash flows consists of +$100 at the end of period one, -$50 at the end of period two, and +$35 at the end of period three, and the interest rate per compounding period is 5% (0.05) then the present value of these three Cash Flows are:

$$PV_{1} = \frac{\$100}{(1.05)^{1}} = \$95.24 \,$$
$$PV_{2} = \frac{-\$50}{(1.05)^{2}} = -\$45.35 \,$$
$PV_{3} = \frac{\$35}{(1.05)^{3}} = \$30.23 \,$ respectively

Thus the net present value would be:

$$NPV = PV_{1}+PV_{2}+PV_{3} = \frac{100}{(1.05)^{1}} + \frac{-50}{(1.05)^{2}} + \frac{35}{(1.05)^{3}} = 95.24 - 45.35 + 30.23 = 80.12,$$

There are a few considerations to be made.

- The periods might not be consecutive. If this is the case, the exponents will change to reflect the appropriate number of periods
- The interest rates per period might not be the same. The cash flow must be discounted using the interest rate for the appropriate period: if the interest rate changes, the sum must be discounted to the period where the change occurs using the second interest rate, then discounted back to the present using the first interest rate. For example, if the cash flow for period one is $100, and $200 for period two, and the interest rate for the first period is 5%, and 10% for the second, then the net present value would be:

$$NPV = 100\,(1.05)^{-1} + 200\,(1.10)^{-1}\,(1.05)^{-1} = \frac{100}{(1.05)^{1}} + \frac{200}{(1.10)^{1}(1.05)^{1}} = \$95.24 + \$173.16 = \$268.40$$

- The interest rate must necessarily coincide with the payment period. If not, either the payment period or the interest rate must be modified. For example, if the interest rate given is the effective annual interest rate, but cash flows are received (and/or paid) quarterly, the interest rate per quarter must be computed. This can be done by converting effective annual interest rate, $\, i \,$, to nominal annual interest rate compounded quarterly:

$(1+i) = \left(1+\frac{i^{4}}{4}\right)^4$

Here, $i^{4}$ is the nominal annual interest rate, compounded quarterly, and the interest rate per quarter is $\frac{i^{4}}{4}$

==== Present value of an annuity ====
Many financial arrangements (including bonds, other loans, leases, salaries, membership dues, annuities including annuity-immediate and annuity-due, straight-line depreciation charges) stipulate structured payment schedules; payments of the same amount at regular time intervals. Such an arrangement is called an annuity. The expressions for the present value of such payments are summations of geometric series.

There are two types of annuities: an annuity-immediate and annuity-due. For an annuity immediate, $\, n \,$ payments are received (or paid) at the end of each period, at times 1 through $\, n \,$, while for an annuity due, $\, n \,$ payments are received (or paid) at the beginning of each period, at times 0 through $\, n-1 \,$. This subtle difference must be accounted for when calculating the present value.

An annuity due is an annuity immediate with one more interest-earning period. Thus, the two present values differ by a factor of $(1+i)$:

$PV_\text{annuity due} = PV_\text{annuity immediate}(1+i) \,\!$

The present value of an annuity immediate is the value at time 0 of the stream of cash flows:

$$PV = \sum_{k=1}^{n} \frac{C}{(1+i)^{k}} = C\left[\frac{1-(1+i)^{-n}}{i}\right], \qquad (1)$$

where:

$\, n \,$ = number of periods,

$\, C \,$ = amount of cash flows,

$\, i \,$ = effective periodic interest rate or rate of return.

==== An approximation for annuity and loan calculations ====
The above formula (1) for annuity immediate calculations offers little insight for the average user and requires the use of some form of computing machinery. There is an approximation which is less intimidating, easier to compute and offers some insight for the non-specialist. It is given by

$$C \approx  PV \left( \frac {1}{n} + \frac {2}{3} i \right)$$

Where, as above, C is annuity payment, PV is principal, n is number of payments, starting at end of first period, and i is interest rate per period. Equivalently C is the periodic loan repayment for a loan of PV extending over n periods at interest rate, i. The formula is valid (for positive n, i) for ni≤3. For completeness, for ni≥3 the approximation is $C \approx PV i$.

The formula can, under some circumstances, reduce the calculation to one of mental arithmetic alone. For example, what are the (approximate) loan repayments for a loan of PV = $10,000 repaid annually for n = ten years at 15% interest (i = 0.15)? The applicable approximate formula is C ≈ 10,000*(1/10 + (2/3) 0.15) = 10,000*(0.1+0.1) = 10,000*0.2 = $2000 pa by mental arithmetic alone. The true answer is $1993, very close.

The overall approximation is accurate to within ±6% (for all n≥1) for interest rates 0≤i≤0.20 and within ±10% for interest rates 0.20≤i≤0.40. It is, however, intended only for "rough" calculations.

==== Present value of a perpetuity ====
A perpetuity refers to periodic payments, receivable indefinitely, although few such instruments exist. The present value of a perpetuity can be calculated by taking the limit of the above formula as n approaches infinity.

$$PV\,=\,\frac{C}{i}. \qquad (2)$$

Formula (2) can also be found by subtracting from (1) the present value of a perpetuity delayed n periods, or directly by summing the present value of the payments

$$PV = \sum_{k=1}^\infty \frac{C}{(1+i)^{k}} = \frac{C}{i}, \qquad i > 0,$$

which form a geometric series.

Again there is a distinction between a perpetuity immediate – when payments received at the end of the period – and a perpetuity due – payment received at the beginning of a period. And similarly to annuity calculations, a perpetuity due and a perpetuity immediate differ by a factor of $(1+i)$:

$PV_\text{perpetuity due} = PV_\text{perpetuity immediate}(1+i) \,\!$

==== PV of a bond ====
See: Bond valuation#Present value approach

A corporation issues a bond, an interest earning debt security, to an investor to raise funds. The bond has a face value, $F$, coupon rate, $r$, and maturity date which in turn yields the number of periods until the debt matures and must be repaid. A bondholder will receive coupon payments semiannually (unless otherwise specified) in the amount of $Fr$, until the bond matures, at which point the bondholder will receive the final coupon payment and the face value of a bond, $F(1+r)$.

The present value of a bond is the purchase price. The purchase price can be computed as:

$PV = \left[\sum_{k=1}^{n} Fr(1+i)^{-k}\right]$ $+ F(1+i)^{-n}$

The purchase price is equal to the bond's face value if the coupon rate is equal to the current interest rate of the market, and in this case, the bond is said to be sold 'at par'. If the coupon rate is less than the market interest rate, the purchase price will be less than the bond's face value, and the bond is said to have been sold 'at a discount', or below par. Finally, if the coupon rate is greater than the market interest rate, the purchase price will be greater than the bond's face value, and the bond is said to have been sold 'at a premium', or above par.

===== Technical details =====
Present value is additive. The present value of a bundle of cash flows is the sum of each one's present value. See time value of money for further discussion. These calculations must be applied carefully, as there are underlying assumptions:

- That it is not necessary to account for price inflation, or alternatively, that the cost of inflation is incorporated into the interest rate; see Inflation-indexed bond.
- That the likelihood of receiving the payments is high — or, alternatively, that the default risk is incorporated into the interest rate; see Corporate bond#Risk analysis.

(In fact, the present value of a cashflow at a constant interest rate is mathematically one point in the Laplace transform of that cashflow, evaluated with the transform variable (usually denoted "s") equal to the interest rate. The full Laplace transform is the curve of all present values, plotted as a function of interest rate. For discrete time, where payments are separated by large time periods, the transform reduces to a sum, but when payments are ongoing on an almost continual basis, the mathematics of continuous functions can be used as an approximation.)

=== Variants/approaches ===
There are mainly two flavors of Present Value. Whenever there will be uncertainties in both timing and amount of the cash flows, the expected present value approach will often be the appropriate technique. With Present Value under uncertainty, future dividends are replaced by their conditional expectation.

- Traditional Present Value Approach – in this approach a single set of estimated cash flows and a single interest rate (commensurate with the risk, typically a weighted average of cost components) will be used to estimate the fair value.
- Expected Present Value Approach – in this approach multiple cash flows scenarios with different/expected probabilities and a credit-adjusted risk free rate are used to estimate the fair value.

=== Choice of interest rate ===
The interest rate used is the risk-free interest rate if there are no risks involved in the project. The rate of return from the project must equal or exceed this rate of return or it would be better to invest the capital in these risk free assets. If there are risks involved in an investment this can be reflected through the use of a risk premium. The risk premium required can be found by comparing the project with the rate of return required from other projects with similar risks. Thus it is possible for investors to take account of any uncertainty involved in various investments.

== Present value method of valuation ==
An investor, the lender of money, must decide the financial project in which to invest their money, and present value offers one method of deciding. A financial project requires an initial outlay of money, such as the price of stock or the price of a corporate bond. The project claims to return the initial outlay, as well as some surplus (for example, interest, or future cash flows). An investor can decide which project to invest in by calculating each projects’ present value (using the same interest rate for each calculation) and then comparing them. The project with the smallest present value – the least initial outlay – will be chosen because it offers the same return as the other projects for the least amount of money.

== Years' purchase ==
The traditional method of valuing future income streams as a present capital sum is to multiply the average expected annual cash-flow by a multiple, known as "years' purchase". For example, in selling to a third party a property leased to a tenant under a 99-year lease at a rent of $10,000 per annum, a deal might be struck at "20 years' purchase", which would value the lease at 20 * $10,000, i.e. $200,000. This equates to a present value discounted in perpetuity at 5%. For a riskier investment the purchaser would demand to pay a lower number of years' purchase. This was the method used for example by the English crown in setting re-sale prices for manors seized at the Dissolution of the Monasteries in the early 16th century. The standard usage was 20 years' purchase.

== See also ==
- Capital budgeting
- Current yield
- Lifetime value
- Liquidation
- Net present value
- Present value interest factor
