= Ommo =

Ommo may refer to:

- Ommo Clark, Nigerian software designer
- Umā, a Hindu goddess, historically known as Ommo

== See also ==
- Omo (disambiguation)
