= Antoine Deparcieux =

French mathematician

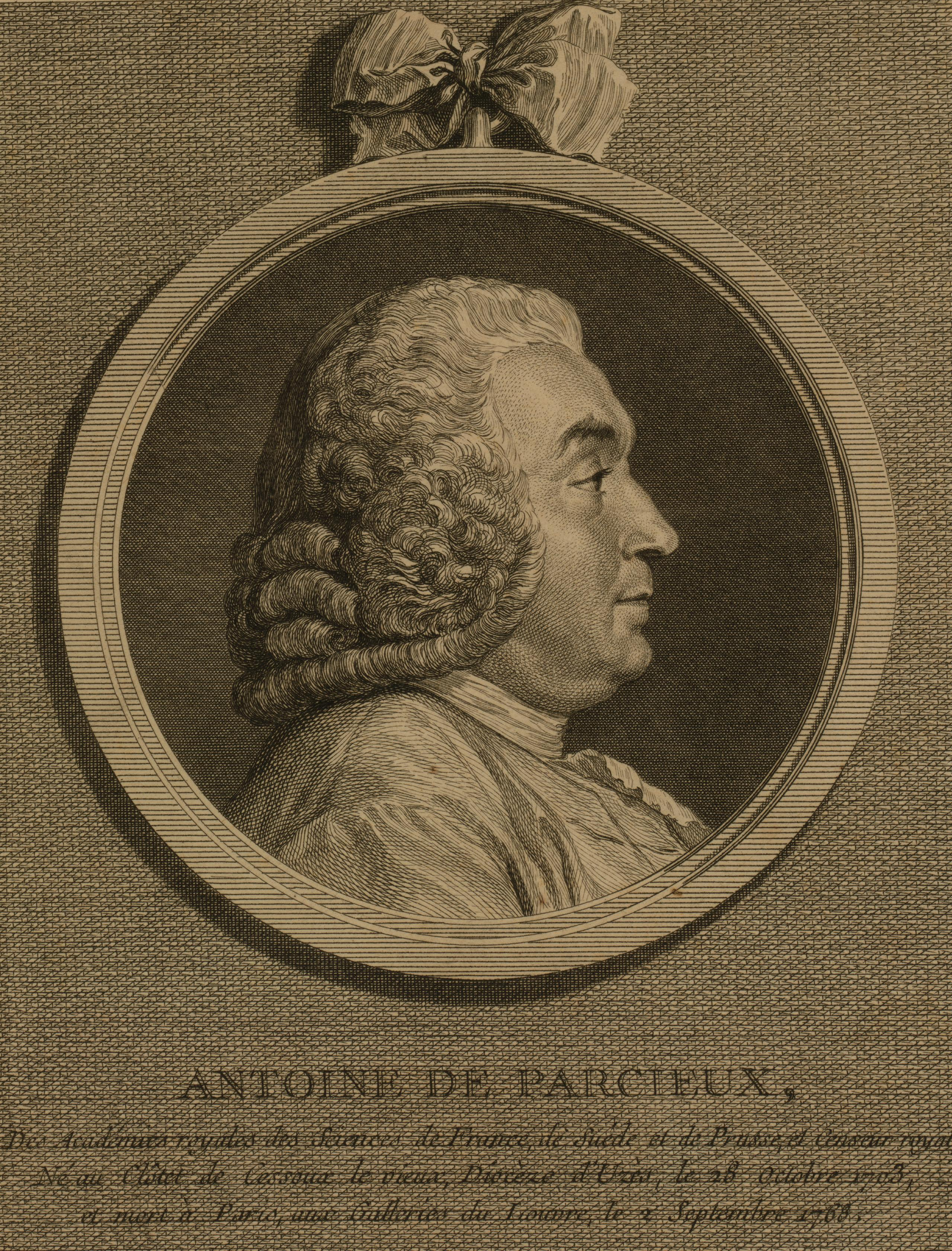
Antoine Deparcieux

Antoine Deparcieux (28 October 1703 – 2 September 1768) was a French mathematician. He was born at Clessous in the Portes, province of Languedoc. He attended the school of Saint Florent for 10 years while working on his family farm. In 1725, his desire for learning took him to Lyon, where he studied at a Jesuit school for five years. Then, in 1730, he went to Paris to increase his knowledge of mathematics and physics. He made a living by manufacturing sundials.

In 1746, he became a member of the Academy of Sciences, and in about 1765 was named Censeur Royal. He was also librarian at the University of Strasbourg, and member of the Academy of Sciences of Paris, Montpellier, Lyon, Amiens, Metz, Berlin, and Stockholm.

== Accomplishments ==
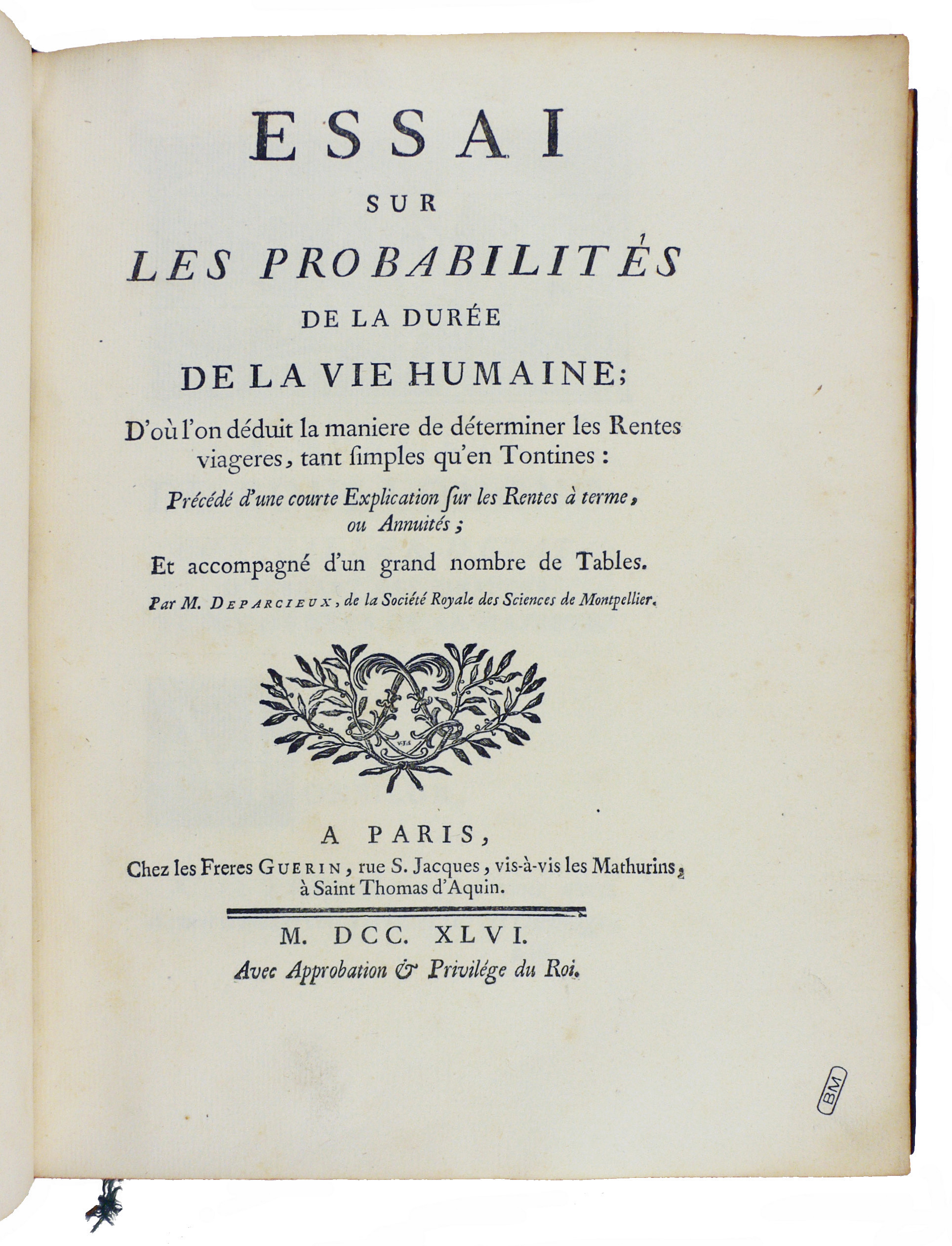
Essai sur les probabilités, 1746.

Among his constructions were:

- A machine to raise water at Crécy castle
- A pump for castle of Arnouville
- A press for the production of tobacco

He also published many works, including:

- Traité de trigonométrie rectiligne et sphérique (1738), approved by the Academy of Sciences
- Nouveau traité de trigonométrie, (avec table des sinus et logarithmes) (1740)
- Traité complet de Gnomonique (1741)
- Essai sur les probabilités de la durée de la vie humaine (1746) ("Essay on the probabilities of the human lifespan"), which is the work for which he is best known
- Mémoire sur la courbure des ondes (1747)

In 1758, Deparcieux was elected a foreign member of the Royal Swedish Academy of Sciences.

== See also ==
- Life annuity
