= Certificate of life =

Certificate to prove an individual was alive

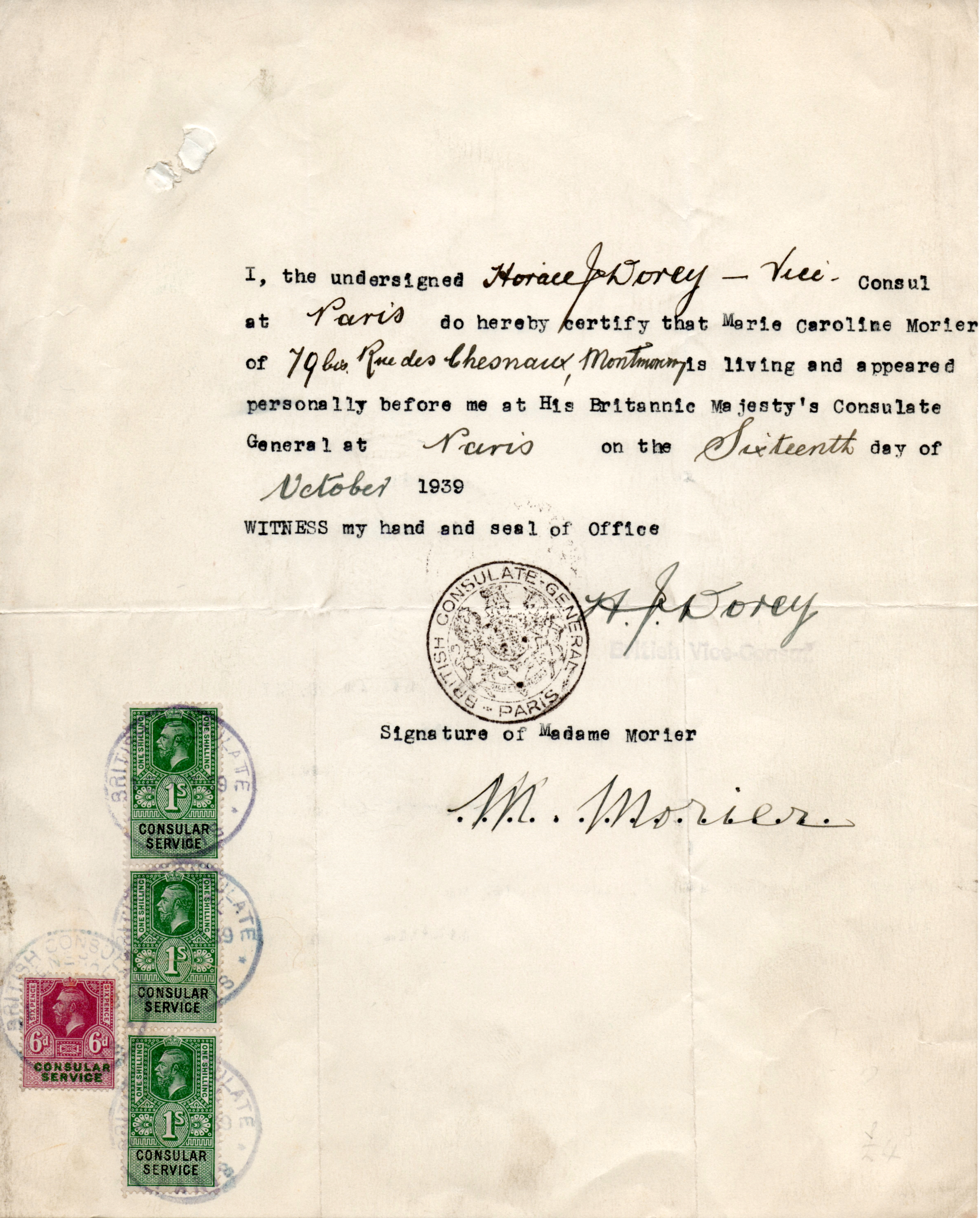
A 1939 Certificate of Life from the British Embassy in Paris. The fee has been paid through the application of revenue stamps.

A Certificate of Life (also called a Certificate of Existence, Letter of Existence, Life Certificate, Proof of Life) is a certificate produced by a trusted entity to confirm that an individual was alive at the time of its creation.

Governments, pension and insurance companies and other bodies may need to check periodically that the people they are paying have not died in order that they do not overpay annuities and pensions.

Where individuals are resident outside their country of origin, a Certificate of Life may sometimes be obtained from a person's embassy in their country of residence by producing proof of identity such as a passport.
