= Open Market Option =

The Open Market Option (or OMO) is a British government regulation that allows someone approaching retirement in the United Kingdom to ‘shop around’ for a number of options to convert their pension pot into an annuity, rather than simply taking the default rate offered by their pension provider. The option was introduced as part of the 1975 United Kingdom Finance Act.

The term OMO is generally used to support a campaign, often led by the pensions industry and the media, to make sure people know the benefits of shopping around. The majority of people still don’t use the Open Market Option in large part because they don’t know they can or don’t realise the benefits of doing so. Retirees who don’t use the OMO and settle for the default deal offered by their pension provider, may be missing out on up to 20% more income from an annuity. This is especially important as retirees cannot change their annuity once it has been purchased.

One of the main reasons that people can get more from an annuity if they shop around is that they may qualify for what is known as an Enhanced Annuity (sometimes known as an Impaired Life Annuity) which pays a higher income to people who suffer from a range of health conditions – anything from asthma to a serious heart condition. There are also other products available that may suit people’s retirement needs better than the default deal offered by a pension provider. One suggestion to make the most of the Open Market Option is to speak to an independent financial adviser who will explain the different options available at retirement.

The Association of British Insurers has been working with the retirement industry to improve consumers' knowledge of the Open Market Option. This includes pensions providers making it much clearer to their customers that they can use the OMO and that they may get a better income by doing so. However, take up of the Open Market Option is still low and there are now calls from many to make it harder for a pension scheme to transfer into an annuity by default, thereby forcing people to consider their options.
