= Future value =

Value of an asset at a specific date

Future value is the value of a current sum of money or stream of cash flows at a specified date in the future, given an assumed rate of return or interest rate. It reflects the time value of money, which holds that a sum of money has different value at different points in time because it can earn a return if invested.

In finance and economics, future value is used to express how much a present present amount will grow when it earns simple interest or compound interest, and to compare different investment or borrowing options.

== Overview ==
The idea of future value is closely related to the time value of money. It reflects the fact that a sum of money available today is usually worth more than the same nominal amount received in the future, because money held now can be invested to earn interest or another return.

For example, if £100 is placed in a bank account that pays 5% interest per year and interest is credited once a year, the balance after one year will be £105. For an investor who expects a 5% return and ignores inflation, the future value of the £100 after one year is therefore £105.

The concept helps individuals and firms decide whether to spend money now, or to defer spending by saving or investing. Comparing the future value of saving with the utility of current consumption highlights the opportunity cost of using funds immediately. In corporate and investment finance, future values are used together with present value to analyse long term projects and securities such as bonds and annuities.

Inflation affects the purchasing power of future cash flows. A calculation that uses a nominal interest rate gives a nominal future value that does not adjust for inflation. For example, if £100 earns a nominal interest rate of 5% over one year, the nominal future value is £105, but if prices rise by about 2% over the same period, the real value of that future amount is closer to £103 in terms of current prices. Analysts often distinguish between nominal and real interest rates and may use real discount rates or inflation adjustments, such as those implied by the Fisher equation.

== Simple interest ==
To determine future value (FV) using simple interest (that is, without compounding), the future value of a single amount is given by:

$$\text{FV} = \text{PV}(1+rt)$$

where $\text{PV}$ is the present value, $r$ is the simple interest rate per time period in decimal form, and $t$ is the number of time periods.

The simple interest earned over the period is $\text{PV} r t$, so the future value is the sum of the original principal and interest. For example, if £100 earns simple interest at 5% per year for three years, the future value is $\text{FV} = 100(1 + 0.05 \times 3) = 115$, because the total interest is $100 \times 0.05 \times 3 = 15$.

Because interest is applied only to the principal, the future value under simple interest increases in proportion to $t$, and so is a linear function of time. For a given nominal rate and period, compound interest produces a higher future value as interest is earned on both the principal and previously accrued interest.

== Compound interest ==
To determine the future value using compound interest, the future value $\text{FV}$ of a single amount invested at a periodic interest rate is:

$$\text{FV} = \text{PV}(1+i)^n$$

where $\text{PV}$ is the present value, $i$ is the interest rate per compounding period, and $n$ is the number of compounding periods. For a given present value and interest rate, the future value increases as the number of compounding periods increases, and the growth of the investment over time is exponential.

Solving this expression for $n$ gives the number of compounding periods needed for an amount to reach a specified future value. For example, at an interest rate of 5% per year, a lump sum doubles in value when $(1 + 0.05)^n = 2$, which corresponds to a doubling time of a little over fourteen years. Approximate mental rules for doubling time, such as the Rule of 72, use the same relationship between the growth factor and the number of periods.

=== Multiple compounding periods and effective annual rate ===
If the stated nominal annual interest rate is $j$ and interest is compounded $m$ times per year, the interest rate per compounding period is $j/m$. When the time to maturity is $t$ years, so that there are $n=mt$ compounding periods, the future value of a present amount can be written as:

$\text{FV} = \text{PV} \left(1 + {j \over m}\right)^{mt}$.

For example, if an account pays interest at a nominal rate of 6% per year compounded twice a year, the periodic rate is 3% and there are two compounding periods in a year. The effective annual rate $r$ is then:

$(1 + 0.03)^2 - 1 \approx 0.061$

so the investment grows over the year by about 6.1%.

More generally, if a nominal annual rate $j$ is compounded $m$ times per year, the effective annual rate $r$ is:

$r = \left(1 + {j \over m}\right)^m - 1.$

=== Continuous compounding ===
If interest is compounded continuously at a nominal annual rate $j$, the effective annual rate is:

$$r = e^{j} - 1$$

which is the limit of the previous expression as the number of compounding periods per year tends to infinity. For an investment held for $t$ years, the future value of a present amount under continuous compounding is:

$\text{FV} = \text{PV} e^{j t}.$

=== Future value of an annuity ===
Compound interest formulas apply to a series of level payments or deposits. The future value $\text{FV}_\text{annuity}$ at the end of $n$ periods of an ordinary annuity, with payment $\text{PMT}$ made at the end of each period and interest rate $r$ per period, is:

$\text{FV}_\text{annuity} = \text{PMT} \frac{(1 + r)^n - 1}{r}.$

Here $r$ is the interest rate per period, $n$ is the number of payments and $\text{PMT}$ is the fixed payment amount. This formula is used to calculate the future value of a stream of equal contributions to a savings or retirement account and to analyse loan repayment schedules.

== Applications ==
Future value calculations are widely used in personal finance to plan for savings goals and retirement. Households use the future value of a single deposit or a series of regular deposits to estimate how much money will be available at a target date in a savings account or retirement plan. For example, a family saving towards a house deposit or future education costs may compare different contribution amounts and time horizons by calculating the future value of regular monthly payments.

In banking and consumer credit, lenders and borrowers consider the future value of loan balances and other obligations. For example, a contract may specify a single balloon payment at a future date, or the amount that will be outstanding if the loan is repaid early. These future cash amounts depend on the interest rate and compounding convention stated in the agreement.

In corporate and investment finance, future value is used together with present value in discounted cash flow and net present value analysis. Projected cash flows from an investment or a capital project can be discounted to present value or compounded to a common future date in order to compare alternatives.

Basic future value calculations usually assume a constant interest or discount rate over time and do not directly incorporate inflation, taxes or uncertainty. In practice, analysts may work with real, term-dependant rates that adjust for inflation, and incorporate risk by using different discount rates or by modelling cash flows under different scenarios.

== See also ==
- Customer lifetime value
- Time value of money
- Simple interest
- Compound interest
- Annuity
