= Present value interest factor =

In economics, present value interest factor (PVIF) is used in finance theory to refer to the output of a calculation, used to determine the monthly payment needed to repay a loan. The calculation involves a number of variables, which are set out in the following description of the calculation:

== Formula ==
Let:

$W$ = the amount borrowed (loan)
$i$ = the effective (i.e. convertible annually) annual interest rate charged
$n$ = the number of years over which the loan will be outstanding
$A$ = the annual amount of the fixed regular payments that will amortize (i.e. repay) the loan
$m$ = the frequency of these regular payments, e.g. m = 2 means the payments are half-yearly.

Then:

$$A = \frac{W}{PVIF}$$

where

$$PVIF = \frac{1}{m} \cdot \frac{1-(1+i)^{-n}} {(1+i)^{1/m}-1}$$

In its simplest form, PVIF is calculated using the formula:

$$PVIF = (1 + r)^{-n}$$

where $r$ is the discount rate (or interest rate) and $n$ is the number of periods.

== See also ==
- Time value of money
- Life annuity
- Fixed-rate mortgage
- Amortization calculator
