= Annuity =

Series of payments made at equal intervals

In investment, an annuity is a series of payments of the same kind made at equal time intervals, usually over a finite term. Annuities are commonly issued by life insurance companies, where an individual pays a lump sum or a series of premiums in return for regular income payments, often to provide retirement or survivor benefits.

Typical examples include regular deposits to a savings account, monthly home mortgage payments, monthly insurance premiums and pension payments. The value of an annuity is usually expressed as a present value or future value, calculated by discounting or accumulating the payments at a specified interest rate.

Annuities can be classified by the timing of payments, for example annuity-immediate and annuity-due, by whether the term is fixed or contingent on survival, and by whether the amounts are fixed, variable or linked to an index. Contracts may start paying immediately or after a deferral period, and a contract that continues indefinitely is a perpetuity.

== History ==
In medieval and early modern Europe, annuities developed through rents, rentes, and other rights to income. A buyer or creditor could provide capital in return for a recurring payment secured by land, municipal revenue, or another income source. These arrangements included perpetual rents, life rents, term annuities, and municipal annuities used to finance wars, public works, or debt consolidation. Because the transaction could be framed as the sale of an income right, it provided a form of credit in legal and religious settings where direct interest-bearing loans were restricted.

By the sixteenth and seventeenth centuries, annuities had become important instruments of public finance. Governments and municipalities in the Dutch Republic, France, and England sold fixed-term, perpetual, and life-contingent annuities to raise money. Life annuities created a valuation problem because the issuer had to allow for both interest and uncertain survival. Crude pricing could make the contracts costly for issuers if buyers with long expected lifetimes obtained terms that did not reflect age or mortality.

The mathematical treatment of life-contingent payments developed from this practical problem. John Graunt's work on the Bills of Mortality helped show that deaths could be studied statistically at the population level. In 1671, Johan de Witt prepared a report on life annuities for the Dutch government that used discounted expected-value reasoning to compare life annuities with redeemable annuities. Later work by Edmond Halley used data from Breslau to construct a life table and to calculate life-annuity values. Together, these works applied mortality observations and compound-interest calculations to payments contingent on survival.

Tontine schemes developed alongside ordinary life annuities. In a tontine, payments to surviving participants could increase as other participants died, while a life annuity normally promised a stated income while the annuitant survived. Governments used tontines as public-borrowing instruments, but their payment structure exposed participants to a different form of longevity pooling from ordinary life annuities. Recent proposals have revived tontine-like arrangements as retirement-income designs that pool longevity risk without promising each participant a fixed lifetime payment.

During the eighteenth century, annuity mathematics expanded to joint lives, survivor benefits, and reversions. Reversionary annuities, which typically paid a widow or dependent after another person's death, were used in widows' funds, clergy funds, and other mutual or occupational arrangements. Their pricing depended on mortality assumptions, selection, contribution levels, and the terms on which participants entered the scheme.

By the nineteenth century, annuity business had largely moved from private and public obligations to incorporated life insurance institutions that priced contracts using observed mortality experience. Actuarial practice changed annuity business because long-duration promises required mortality tables, interest assumptions, reserves, and solvency methods. Life insurance and life annuities became connected within the same institutions, since life insurance protects against early death while a life annuity protects against unusually long survival.

In the twentieth century, pensions and public retirement systems made annuity-like income more common even where individuals did not buy retail annuities directly. Defined benefit pensions and public pension schemes often provide lifetime income, while joint-and-survivor pension options use multiple-life annuity principles. In the United States, private annuity markets remained small until the 1930s, when demand for insurance-company products grew during the Great Depression and group annuity contracts for corporate pension plans developed.

Variable annuities later grew as contracts that combined investment-linked features with the tax deferral available to life insurance products. Late twentieth- and early twenty-first-century annuity markets added fixed deferred annuities, indexed annuities, income riders, pension risk transfer, and longevity-risk transfer markets. Research on the annuity puzzle has linked low voluntary annuitisation to factors such as existing pension income, bequest motives, liquidity preference, product complexity, pricing, and behavioural framing.

== Types ==
Annuities may be classified in several ways.

=== Timing of payments ===
Payments in an annuity-immediate are made at the end of each payment period, so interest accrues during the period before each payment. By contrast, payments in an annuity-due are made at the beginning of each period, so each payment is made in advance.

Typical examples of annuity-immediate payment streams include home mortgage and other loan repayments, where each installment covers interest that has accrued during the preceding period. Rent, leases and many insurance premiums are usually paid in advance and are therefore examples of annuity-due payments.

=== Contingency of payments ===
An annuity that pays over a fixed period, regardless of the survival of any individual, is an annuity certain. In this case the number of payments is known in advance and specified in the contract.

A life annuity pays while one or more specified lives survive, so the number of payments is uncertain. Pensions that pay a regular income for life are examples of life annuities.

A certain-and-life annuity, also called a life annuity with period certain, combines these features. Payments continue for at least a guaranteed minimum term and thereafter for as long as the annuitant is alive.

=== Variability of payments ===
- Fixed annuities provide payments determined using a fixed interest rate declared by the insurer, so the contract offers a guaranteed minimum rate of return on the account value.
- Variable annuities invest premiums in underlying portfolios such as mutual funds, so the contract value and income payments vary with the performance of those investments.
- Equity-indexed annuities credit interest based partly on the performance of a specified market index, usually subject to a minimum guaranteed return and features such as caps or participation rates.

=== Deferral of payments ===
A deferred annuity starts income payments after a deferral or accumulation period. During the deferral period the contract typically credits interest or investment returns to the account value. A immediate annuity starts payments shortly after the contract is purchased, often within one year.

Fixed, variable and indexed annuities can each be written as immediate or deferred contracts.

=== Optional benefits and riders ===
Many annuities allow optional riders or benefits for an added cost. Death-benefit riders may provide a beneficiary with a minimum amount, a return of premium, or a stepped-up account value if the owner or annuitant dies before income begins. Living-benefit riders may provide guaranteed minimum income, withdrawal, or accumulation benefits while the owner remains alive.

Such features can change the distribution of risk between the owner and the insurer, but they may also add charges, restrict investment choices, limit withdrawal amounts, or reduce the value of guarantees after withdrawals. The economic effect of a rider therefore depends on both the stated guarantee and the contract conditions attached to using it.

=== Special-purpose forms ===
Annuities are used in legal, charitable, and pension arrangements. A structured settlement may use an annuity contract to fund periodic payments owed under a personal-injury or workers' compensation settlement. A charitable gift annuity is a transfer of property to a charitable organisation in return for annuity payments over one or two lives, with the charitable component depending on the relationship between the property transferred and the actuarial value of the payments. In pension risk transfer, a defined benefit pension scheme may use a bulk annuity, buy-in, or buy-out to transfer some or all pension-payment obligations to an insurer.

These special-purpose forms share the annuity feature of periodic or life-contingent payments, but their legal purpose and risk allocation differ from retail retirement annuities. Structured settlements focus on scheduled compensation payments, charitable gift annuities combine lifetime payments with a charitable transfer, and pension risk transfer annuities shift pension liabilities from a pension scheme or sponsor to an insurer.

== Valuation ==
Valuation of an annuity treats the stream of payments as cash flows and summarises them by a present value or a future value at a given interest rate. For a level annuity certain, the formulas depend on whether payments are made at the end or at the beginning of each period.

=== Annuity-certain ===
If the number of payments is known in advance, the contract is an annuity certain (also called a guaranteed annuity). Valuation uses the formulas below, which depend on the timing of payments.

==== Annuity-immediate ====
If payments are made at the end of each period, so interest accrues during the period before each payment, the annuity is an annuity-immediate (ordinary annuity). Mortgage payments are a typical example, since interest is charged between payments and then repaid at each due date.

	↓	↓	...	↓	payments
———	———	———	———	—
0	1	2	...	n	periods

Let $i$ denote the effective interest rate per period and $n$ the number of payments. The present value factor for a level annuity-immediate with unit payments is:
$$a_{\overline{n}|i} = \frac{1-(1+i)^{-n}}{i}$$
and the present value of payments of amount $R$ is:

$\mathrm{PV}(i,n,R) = R\,a_{\overline{n}|i}.$

In practice, interest is often quoted as a nominal annual rate $J$ convertible monthly or some other frequency. If payments are monthly and the nominal annual rate is $J$, then the rate per month is $i = J/12$ and the number of payments over $t$ years is $n = 12t$.

The future value of a level annuity-immediate with unit payments is
$$s_{\overline{n}|i} = \frac{(1+i)^n-1}{i}$$
and the accumulated value immediately after the last payment is:

$\mathrm{FV}(i,n,R) = R\,s_{\overline{n}|i}.$

Example: The present value of a 5 year annuity with a nominal annual interest rate of 12% and monthly payments of $100 is
$$\mathrm{PV}\!\left( \frac{0.12}{12},5\times 12,100\right) = 100 \times a_{\overline{60}|0.01} \approx 4{,}495.50$$
so the series of payments is equivalent to a single amount of about $4,496 at time zero.

Future and present values for an annuity-immediate are related by
$$s_{\overline{n}|i} = (1+i)^n\,a_{\overline{n}|i}$$
and

$\frac{1}{a_{\overline{n}|i}} - \frac{1}{s_{\overline{n}|i}} = i.$

===== Proof of annuity-immediate formula =====
To obtain the present value factor, consider a level annuity-immediate with unit payments. The payment at the end of period $k$ is discounted by the factor $(1+i)^{-k}$, so the present value factor is
$$a_{\overline{n}|i} = \sum_{k=1}^{n} \frac{1}{(1+i)^k}.$$
Let $v = (1+i)^{-1}$ be the discount factor for one period. Then
$$a_{\overline{n}|i} = v + v^{2} + \cdots + v^{n} = v\sum_{k=0}^{n-1} v^{k}.$$
Using the standard formula for the sum of a finite geometric series gives

$a_{\overline{n}|i} = v\,\frac{1-v^{n}}{1-v} = \frac{1-v^{n}}{i} = \frac{1-(1+i)^{-n}}{i}.$

==== Annuity-due ====
An annuity due is a series of equal payments made at the same interval at the beginning of each period. Periods can be monthly, quarterly, semi-annually, annually or any other defined period. Examples include rentals, leases and many insurance payments, which are made to cover services provided in the period following the payment.

↓	↓	...	↓		payments
———	———	———	———	—
0	1	...	n − 1	n	periods

For an annuity-due with unit payments the present value factor is
$$\ddot{a}_{\overline{n}|i} = (1+i)\,a_{\overline{n}|i}$$
and the future value factor is

$\ddot{s}_{\overline{n}|i} = (1+i)\,s_{\overline{n}|i}.$

The present and future values for an annuity-due satisfy
$$\ddot{s}_{\overline{n}|i} = (1+i)^n\,\ddot{a}_{\overline{n}|i}$$
and
$$\frac{1}{\ddot{a}_{\overline{n}|i}} - \frac{1}{\ddot{s}_{\overline{n}|i}} = d,$$
where $d = \frac{i}{1+i}$ is the effective rate of discount.

Example: The future value of a 7 year annuity-due with a nominal annual interest rate of 9% and monthly payments of $100 is
$$\mathrm{FV}_{\text{due}}\!\left(\frac{0.09}{12},7\times 12,100\right) = 100 \times \ddot{s}_{\overline{84}|0.0075} \approx 11{,}730.01.$$

==== Perpetuity ====
A perpetuity is an annuity for which the payments continue indefinitely. For a level perpetuity with payment $R$ each period and per period interest rate $i$, the present value can be obtained as the limit of the level annuity-immediate present value as the term tends to infinity:
$$\lim_{n\to\infty} \mathrm{PV}(i,n,R) = \lim_{n\to\infty} R\,a_{\overline{n}|i} = \frac{R}{i}$$
so the closed form is
$$\mathrm{PV}_{\text{perpetuity}} = \frac{R}{i}$$
provided $i$ is positive. In actuarial notation the present value factors for level perpetuities are
$$a_{\overline{\infty}|i} = \frac{1}{i}$$
and
$$\ddot{a}_{\overline{\infty}|i} = \frac{1}{d},$$
where $d = \frac{i}{1+i}$ is the effective discount rate.

=== Life annuities ===
Valuation of life annuities extends the level annuity formulas by taking into account mortality as well as interest. For a life aged $x$ with annual payments of amount $R$ payable while the life survives, the actuarial present value is the expected value of the discounted payment stream,
$$\mathrm{APV} = \sum_{t=1}^{\infty} R v^{t}\,{}_t p_x$$
where $v = (1+i)^{-1}$ is the discount factor per period and ${}_t p_x$ is the probability that a life aged $x$ survives at least $t$ periods.

In actuarial notation the present value of a whole life annuity-immediate of 1 per year on a life aged $x$ is written $a_x$ and can be expressed as
$$a_x = \sum_{t=1}^{\infty} v^{t}\,{}_t p_x$$
while the corresponding whole life annuity-due has present value factor

$\ddot{a}_x = \sum_{t=0}^{\infty} v^{t}\,{}_t p_x.$

== Amortization calculations ==
If an annuity is used to repay a loan with level payments at the end of each period, the payment stream is an annuity-immediate. Let $P$ be the initial loan principal, $R$ the regular payment, $i$ the effective interest rate per period and $N$ the total number of payments. Then the present value of the payment stream is
$$P = R\,a_{\overline{N}|i} = R\,\frac{1-(1+i)^{-N}}{i},$$
so the level payment that amortises the loan is

$R = \frac{P}{a_{\overline{N}|i}} = P\,\frac{i}{1-(1+i)^{-N}}.$

The outstanding balance after $n$ payments can be obtained in two equivalent ways. Under the retrospective method, the balance is the original principal accumulated with interest for $n$ periods minus the accumulated value of the payments already made:

$B_n = (1+i)^{n} P - R\,\frac{(1+i)^{n}-1}{i} = \frac{R}{i} - (1+i)^{n}\!\left(\frac{R}{i} - P\right).$

Under the prospective method, the outstanding balance is the present value of the remaining $N-n$ payments:

$B_n = R\,a_{\overline{N-n}|i} = R\,\frac{1 - (1+i)^{-(N-n)}}{i}.$

For an annuity due with payments at the beginning of each period, the same ideas apply but annuity-due factors are used. If $R$ is the level payment and there are $N$ payments in total, the outstanding balance after $n$ payments is

$B_n^{(\text{due})} = R\,\ddot{a}_{\overline{N-n}|i}, \qquad \ddot{a}_{\overline{m}|i} = (1+i)\,a_{\overline{m}|i}.$

Example. Let $P = 1{,}000$, $i = 0.10$, $N = 3$. Then
$$R = \frac{P\,i}{1-(1+i)^{-N}} = \frac{1{,}000\times 0.10}{1-(1.10)^{-3}} \approx 402.11.$$
After one payment the retrospective and prospective balances coincide:
$$B_1 = 1{,}000\times 1.10 - 402.11\times\frac{1.10-1}{0.10} \approx 697.89,$$
and
$$B_1 = R\,a_{\overline{2}|0.10} = 402.11\times\frac{1-(1.10)^{-2}}{0.10} \approx 697.89.$$

See also Fixed rate mortgage.

== Example calculations ==
This section gives worked examples for finding the periodic payment $R$ for an annuity due from a given present value or accumulated value. Throughout, $j$ denotes a nominal annual interest rate convertible $m$ times per year, $i = j/m$ is the effective interest rate per payment period and $n$ is the total number of payments.

For an annuity-due with present value $A$, level payment $R$ and $n$ payments, the present value factor is
$$\ddot{a}_{\overline{n}|i} = \left(\frac{1-(1+i)^{-n}}{i}\right)(1+i)$$
so the level payment is

$R = \frac{A}{\ddot{a}_{\overline{n}|i}} = \frac{A}{\left(\frac{1-(1+i)^{-n}}{i}\right)(1+i)}.$

=== Example 1: present value to payment (annuity-due) ===
Suppose the present value of an annuity-due is $A = 70{,}000$, the effective interest rate per period is $i = 0.15$ and there are $n = 3$ annual payments. The annuity-due factor is
$$\ddot{a}_{\overline{3}|0.15} = \left(\frac{1-(1+0.15)^{-3}}{0.15}\right)(1+0.15) \approx 2.63$$
so the level payment is
$$R = \frac{70{,}000}{2.63} \approx \$26{,}659.47.$$

=== Example 2: present value to payment (annuity-due) ===
Suppose $250{,}700$ is the present value of an annuity-due with quarterly payments for 8 years at a nominal annual interest rate of $j = 0.05$ compounded quarterly. Then $i = j/m = 0.05/4 = 0.0125$ and $n = 8\times 4 = 32$. The annuity-due factor is
$$\ddot{a}_{\overline{32}|0.0125} = \left(\frac{1-(1+0.0125)^{-32}}{0.0125}\right)(1+0.0125) \approx 26.57$$
so the level payment is
$$R = \frac{250{,}700}{26.57} \approx \$9{,}435.71.$$

For an annuity-due with accumulated value $S$ at time $n$, level payment $R$ and $n$ payments, the accumulated value factor is
$$\ddot{s}_{\overline{n}|i} = (1+i)\,\frac{(1+i)^{n}-1}{i}$$
so the level payment can be written as

$R = \frac{S}{\ddot{s}_{\overline{n}|i}} = \frac{S\,i}{(1+i)\bigl((1+i)^{n}-1\bigr)}.$

=== Example 3: accumulated value to payment (annuity-due) ===
Suppose the accumulated value of an annuity-due is $S = 55{,}000$, with monthly payments for 3 years at a nominal annual interest rate of $j = 0.15$ compounded monthly. Then $i = j/m = 0.15/12 = 0.0125$ and $n = 3\times 12 = 36$. The annuity-due accumulated value factor is
$$\ddot{s}_{\overline{36}|0.0125} = (1+0.0125)\,\frac{(1+0.0125)^{36}-1}{0.0125} \approx 45.68$$
and the level payment is
$$R = \frac{55{,}000}{45.68} \approx \$1{,}204.04.$$

== Legal regimes ==
- Annuities under American law
- Annuities under European law
- Annuities under Swiss law

== See also ==
- Amortization calculator
- Fixed rate mortgage
- Life annuity
- Perpetuity
- Time value of money

== Other sources ==
- Samuel A. Broverman (2010). Mathematics of Investment and Credit, 5th Edition. ACTEX Academic Series. ACTEX Publications. ISBN 978-1-56698-767-7.
- Stephen Kellison (2008). Theory of Interest, 3rd Edition. McGraw-Hill/Irwin. ISBN 978-0-07-338244-9.
- Sprague, Thomas Bond (1878). "Annuities" . Encyclopædia Britannica. Vol. II (9th ed.). pp. 72–89.
