= Ontario Mathematics Olympiad =

Mathematics competition

The Ontario Mathematics Olympiad (OMO) is an annual mathematics competition for Grade 7s and 8s across Ontario, hosted by the Ontario Association for Mathematics Education (OAME).

== Format ==
Each school can send one team to the OMO, which qualifies by placing in the top two in a regional competition. Each team consists of one Grade 7 boy, one Grade 7 girl, one Grade 8 girl, and one Grade 8 boy. The competition has four stages; individual, pairs, team, and relay. The individual stage is completed by writing a test. The two pairs in the pairs stage are the Grade 7 boy and the Grade 8 girl, and the Grade 8 boy and the Grade 7 girl. Each pair has a set amount of questions to solve. The team stage is completed similarly, with a series of questions. The relay stage is when each member of the team receives a question to answer, but the solution for that question depends on the solution of a previous teammate's question. Thus, if any member of the team does their question wrong, the solutions afterwards are wrong as well.

== Awards ==
There are awards for the top three teams in each of the pairs, team, and relay stages of the competition. For the individual stage, the top three Grade 7 boys, Grade 7 girls, Grade 8 girls, and Grade 8 boys are awarded. There is also a grand prize for the overall winning team.

=== Past competitions ===
A table of previous competitions:

Year	Location	Date
2018	Sheridan College	Jun 08 to Jun 09
2017	Humber College Lakeshore Campus	May 26 to May 27
2016	University of Toronto Scarborough	May 27 to May 28
2015	Carleton University, Ottawa	Jun 05 to Jun 06
2014	Lakehead University, Orillia Campus	May 30 to May 31
2013	TBD	Jun 07 to Jun 08
2012	St. Clair College, Windsor	Jun 08 to Jun 09
2011	University of Toronto, Toronto	Jun 03 to Jun 04
2010	Ontario Educational Leadership Centre, Ramara township (just east of Orillia)	May 28 to May 30
2009	Trent University, Peterborough	May 29 to May 30
2008	Trent University, Peterborough	May 30 to May 31
2007	University of Ottawa, Ottawa	Jun 01 to Jun 02
