= Enhanced annuity =

Enhanced annuity is a type of life annuity that provides a higher than normal level of income to the purchaser because the buyers life expectancy is shorter than average. There are many different types of annuity that one may purchase on approaching retirement and many such annuities can be purchased on enhanced terms.

An enhanced or impaired annuity is an annuity that provides a higher than normal level of income to the purchaser. To qualify for such an annuity, the purchaser's state of health or medical history must be such that their life expectancy is shorter than that of other annuity purchasers.

There are many conditions that might allow one to benefit from a higher annuity rate. These include diabetes, cancer and high blood pressure. Even lifestyle choices such as being a regular smoker might qualify the purchaser for a better rate. Other qualifying conditions might include: obesity, liver conditions, history of heart attacks, high cholesterol levels and Parkinson's disease.
