= Swiss annuity =

A Swiss annuity simply refers to a fixed or variable annuity marketed from Switzerland or issued by a Swiss-based life insurance company but has no legal definition. Insurance brokers promoting annuity contracts issued by insurance companies domiciled in jurisdictions outside of Switzerland, such as Liechtenstein, also market such contracts as Swiss annuities. The hallmarks of a Swiss annuity generally include the ability to invest in multiple currencies, the custody of assets within Switzerland, and the flexibility of withdrawals. Often touted benefits of a Swiss annuity include the safety of Switzerland plus some degree of asset protection.

== U.S. tax considerations ==
For U.S. taxpayers owning a fixed annuity issued by a non-U.S. insurance company, including a Swiss annuity, the interest credited within the policy is subject to U.S. income tax on an annual basis under the original issue discount rules. Variable annuities issued by non-U.S. insurance companies may permit tax deferral in the same manner as an annuity issued by a U.S. domestic insurance company presuming the diversification requirements and investor control limitations of the code and as articulated by the IRS are respected. A Swiss annuity is considered a foreign financial account and reportable to the U.S. Department of Treasury each year by filing Form TD F 90–22.1 (the "FBAR"). Further, a Swiss annuity generally is considered a specified foreign financial asset, which must be reported annually using IRS Form 8938 assuming the value is above certain thresholds.

It is unclear whether U.S. taxpayers can exchange an existing domestically issued life insurance policy or annuity contract for a Swiss annuity on a tax-deferred basis as a result of the ambiguity of the wording of Section 1035(c) of the Internal Revenue Code of 1986, as amended. The U.S. Treasury Department and IRS have not issued regulations applying what was meant by Section 1035(c), which provides "To the extent provided in regulations, subsection (a) shall not apply to any exchange having the effect of transferring property to any person other than a United States person."

Swiss annuities are not subject to the one percent excise tax commonly imposed on purchases of foreign life insurance or annuity policies due to the double tax treaty signed by the U.S. and Switzerland.

== Regulations ==
The Swiss Federal Office of Private Insurance oversees the Swiss insurance industry through the enforcement of rules and regulations. Swiss life insurance companies are required to cover their financial obligations and maintain an extra margin of security that is kept separate from the other assets of the company.
