= Life annuity =

Series of payments at fixed intervals

A life annuity is an annuity, or series of payments at fixed intervals, paid while the purchaser (or annuitant) is alive. The majority of life annuities are insurance products sold or issued by life insurance companies. However, substantial case law indicates that annuity products are not necessarily insurance products.

Annuities can be purchased to provide an income during retirement, or originate from a structured settlement of a personal injury lawsuit. Life annuities may be sold in exchange for the immediate payment of a lump sum (single-payment annuity) or a series of regular payments (flexible payment annuity), prior to the onset of the annuity.

The payment stream from the issuer to the annuitant has an unknown duration based principally upon the date of death of the annuitant. At this point the contract will terminate and the remainder of the fund accumulated is forfeited unless there are other annuitants or beneficiaries in the contract. Thus a life annuity is a form of longevity insurance, where the uncertainty of an individual's lifespan is transferred from the individual to the insurer, which reduces its own uncertainty by pooling many clients.

== History ==
The instrument's evolution has been long and continues as part of actuarial science.

Ulpian is credited with generating an actuarial life annuity table between AD 211 and 222. Medieval German and Dutch cities and monasteries raised money by the sale of life annuities, and it was recognized that pricing them was difficult. The early practice for selling this instrument did not consider the age of the nominee, thereby raising interesting concerns. These concerns got the attention of several prominent mathematicians over the years, such as Huygens, Bernoulli, de Moivre and others: even Gauss and Laplace had an interest in matters pertaining to this instrument.

It seems that Johan de Witt was the first writer to compute the value of a life annuity as the sum of expected discounted future payments, while Halley used the first mortality table drawn from experience for that calculation. Meanwhile, the Paris Hôtel-Dieu offered some fairly priced annuities that roughly fit the Deparcieux table discounted at 5%.

Continuing practice is an everyday occurrence with well-known theory founded on robust mathematics, as witnessed by the hundreds of millions worldwide who receive regular remuneration via pension or the like. The modern approach to resolving the difficult problems related to a larger scope for this instrument applies many advanced mathematical approaches, such as stochastic methods, game theory, and other tools of financial mathematics.

== Types ==
=== Defined benefit pension plans ===
Defined benefit pension plans are a form of life annuity typically provided by employers or governments (such as Social Security in the United States). The size of payouts is usually determined based on the employee's years of service, age and salary.

=== Individual annuity ===
Individual annuities are insurance products marketed to individual consumers. With the complex selection of options available, consumers can find it difficult to decide rationally on the right type of annuity product for their circumstances.

==== Deferred annuity ====
There are two phases for a deferred annuity:

- the accumulation or deferral phase in which the customer deposits (or pays premiums) and accumulates money into an account;
- the distribution or annuitization phase in which the insurance company makes income payments until the death of the annuitants named in the contract

Deferred annuities grow capital by investment in the accumulation phase (or deferral phase) and make payments during the distribution phase. A single premium deferred annuity (SPDA) allows a single deposit or premium at the issue of the annuity with only investment growth during the accumulation phase. A flexible premium deferred annuity (FPDA) allows additional payments or premiums following the initial premium during the accumulation phase.

The phases of an annuity can be combined in the fusion of a retirement savings and retirement payment plan: the annuitant makes regular contributions to the annuity until a certain date and then receives regular payments from it until death. Sometimes there is a life insurance component added so that if the annuitant dies before annuity payments begin, a beneficiary gets either a lump sum or annuity payments.

==== Immediate annuity ====
An annuity with only a distribution phase is an immediate annuity, single premium immediate annuity (SPIA), payout annuity, or income annuity. Such a contract is purchased with a single payment and makes payments until the death of the annuitant(s).

==== Fixed and variable annuity ====
Annuities that make payments in fixed amounts or in amounts that increase by a fixed percentage are called fixed annuities. Variable annuities, by contrast, pay amounts that vary according to the investment performance of a specified set of investments, typically bond and equity mutual funds.

Variable annuities are used for many different objectives. One common objective is deferral of the recognition of taxable gains. Money deposited in a variable annuity grows on a tax-deferred basis, so that taxes on investment gains are not due until a withdrawal is made. Variable annuities offer a variety of funds ("subaccounts") from various money managers. This gives investors the ability to move between subaccounts without incurring additional fees or sales charges.

Variable annuities have been criticized for their high commissions, contingent deferred sale charges, tax deferred growth, high taxes on profits, and high annual costs. Sales abuses became so prevalent that in November 2007, the Securities and Exchange Commission approved FINRA Rule 2821 requiring brokers to determine specific suitability criteria when recommending the purchase or exchange (but not the surrender) of deferred variable annuities.

==== Guaranteed annuity ====
A pure life annuity ceases to make payments on the death of the annuitant. A guaranteed annuity or life and certain annuity, makes payments for at least a certain number of years (the "period certain"); if the annuitant outlives the specified period certain, annuity payments then continue until the annuitant's death, and if the annuitant dies before the expiration of the period certain, the annuitant's estate or beneficiary is entitled to collect the remaining payments certain. The tradeoff between the pure life annuity and the life-with-period-certain annuity is that in exchange for the reduced risk of loss, the annuity payments for the latter will be smaller.

==== Joint annuity ====
Joint-life and joint-survivor annuities make payments until the death of one or both of the annuitants respectively. For example, an annuity may be structured to make payments to a married couple, such payments ceasing on the death of the second spouse. In joint-survivor annuities, sometimes the instrument reduces the payments to the second annuitant after death of the first.

==== Impaired life annuity ====
There has also been a significant growth in the development of enhanced or impaired annuities. These involve improving the terms offered due to a medical diagnosis which is severe enough to reduce life expectancy. A process of medical underwriting is involved and the range of qualifying conditions has increased substantially in recent years. Both conventional annuities and Purchase Life Annuities can qualify for impaired terms.

== Valuation ==
Valuation is the calculation of economic value or worth. Valuation of an annuity is calculated as the actuarial present value of the annuity, which is dependent on the probability of the annuitant living to each future payment period, as well as the interest rate and timing of future payments. Life tables provide the probabilities of survival necessary for such calculations.

== Annuities by region ==
=== United Kingdom ===
In the United Kingdom conversion of pension income into an annuity was compulsory by the age of 75 until new legislation was introduced by the coalition government in April 2011. The new rules allow individuals to delay the decision to purchase an annuity indefinitely.

In the UK there are a large market of annuities of different types. The most common are those where the source of the funds required to buy the annuity is from a pension scheme. Examples of these types of annuity, often referred to as a Compulsory Purchase Annuity, are conventional annuities, with profit annuities and unit linked, or "third way" annuities. Annuities purchased from savings (i.e. not from a pension scheme) are referred to as Purchase Life Annuities and Immediate Vesting Annuities. In October 2009, the International Longevity Centre-UK published a report on Purchased Life Annuities (Time to Annuitise). In the UK it has become common for life companies to base their annuity rates on an individual's location. Legal & General were the first company to do this in 2007.

=== Internationally ===
Some countries developed more options of value for this type of instrument than others. However, a 2005 study reported that some of the risks related to longevity are poorly managed "practically everywhere" due to governments backing away from defined benefit promises and insurance companies being reluctant to sell genuine life annuities because of fears that life expectancy will go up. Longevity insurance is now becoming more common in the UK and the U.S. (see Future of annuities, below) while Chile, in comparison to the U.S., has had a very large life annuity market for 20 years.

== See also ==
- Annuity (European financial arrangements)#Life annuity
- Certificate of life
- Tontine
- Life estate
