= Perpetuity =

Annuity with payments that continue indefinitely

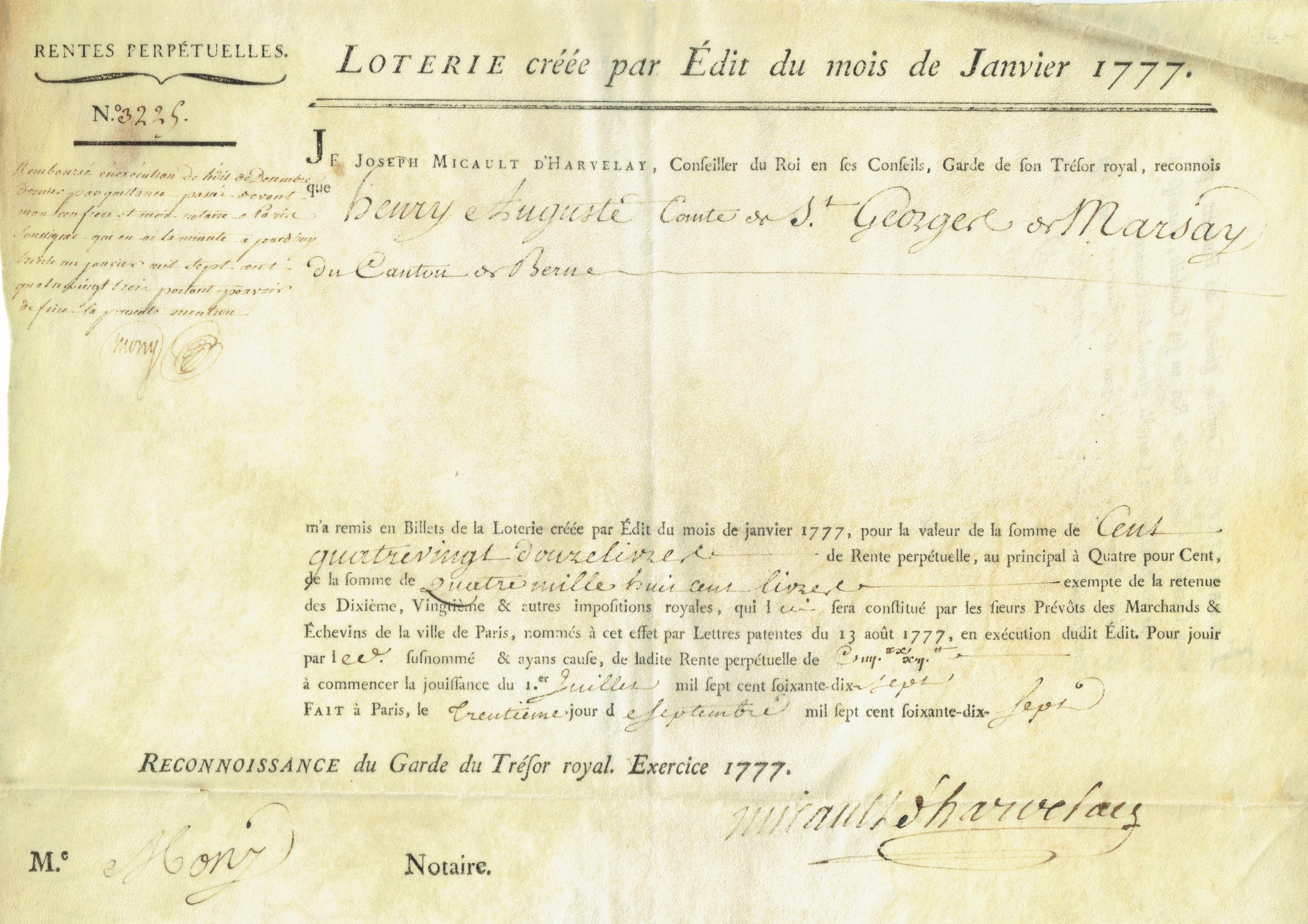
Perpetual annuity of 1777, issued by Joseph Micault d'Harvelay as Royal Treasury Guard in connection with the General Administration of Lotteries.

In finance, a perpetuity is an annuity with payments that continue indefinitely.

Perpetuity formulas are used in time value of money and discounted cash flow valuation. Common applications include valuing shares under the dividend discount model, estimating terminal value in company valuation, and capitalising stabilised income in real estate appraisal.

== Types and assumptions ==
Perpetuity valuation depends on the timing of payments and on whether payments are level or grow over time. The discount rate, $r$ is stated per payment period (for example, per year if payments are annual).

=== Ordinary perpetuity ===
Payments are made at the end of each period, with the first payment one period from now.

=== Perpetuity due ===
Payments are made at the start of each period, with the first payment immediately. Because each payment is received one period earlier, a perpetuity due has a higher present value than an otherwise identical ordinary perpetuity.

=== Level perpetuity ===
The payment amount is constant each period. Standard formulas assume a constant discount rate and $r>0$, so the discounted sum converges to a finite value.

=== Growing perpetuity ===
Payments increase at a constant rate $g$ per period. The usual closed-form valuation applies only when $r>g$. If $r\leq g$, the discounted sum does not converge to a finite value.

== Valuation ==
Valuation follows from discounting each payment and summing the resulting infinite series. Let $r$ be the discount rate per period.

=== Level perpetuity (ordinary perpetuity) ===
Under the ordinary-perpetuity convention (first payment one period from now), a level perpetuity paying $A$ each period has present value:

$PV=\sum_{t=1}^{\infty}\frac{A}{(1+r)^t}$

Expanding the first terms makes the constant ratio between successive terms clear:

$PV=\frac{A}{1+r}+\frac{A}{(1+r)^2}+\frac{A}{(1+r)^3}+\cdots$

Factor out the first term: $PV=\frac{A}{1+r}\left(1+\frac{1}{1+r}+\frac{1}{(1+r)^2}+\cdots\right)$. The bracketed sum is a geometric series with ratio $q=\frac{1}{1+r}$, which converges when $|q|<1$. For $r>0$, this condition holds, so the sum can be evaluated:

$PV=\frac{A}{1+r}\cdot\frac{1}{1-\frac{1}{1+r}}=\frac{A}{r}$

This result means a level perpetuity's value rises in direct proportion to the payment $A$ and falls as the discount rate $r$ increases (future payments are discounted more heavily).

=== Perpetuity due ===
If the first payment is made immediately (a perpetuity due), the present value is larger by one undiscounted payment:

$PV_{\text{due}}=A+\frac{A}{r}$

This result means receiving each payment one period earlier increases value by exactly one extra payment today, because the ordinary-perpetuity value starts discounting from $t=1$.

=== Growing perpetuity ===
A growing perpetuity is derived in the same way. Let $CF_1$ be the expected payment next period, and let payments grow at constant rate $g$, so $CF_t=CF_1(1+g)^{t-1}$. Discounting and summing gives:

$PV=\sum_{t=1}^{\infty}\frac{CF_1(1+g)^{t-1}}{(1+r)^t} =\frac{CF_1}{1+r}\sum_{t=1}^{\infty}\left(\frac{1+g}{1+r}\right)^{t-1}$

The ratio is $\frac{1+g}{1+r}$, so the sum converges when $\frac{1+g}{1+r}<1$, which is equivalent to $r>g$. Evaluating the series yields:

$PV=\frac{CF_1}{1+r}\cdot\frac{1}{1-\frac{1+g}{1+r}}=\frac{CF_1}{r-g}$

This result means the value increases with the next-period cash flow $CF_1$ and increases as growth $g$ rises, but only while $r>g$. As $g$ approaches $r$, the denominator shrinks and the valuation becomes very sensitive to small changes in $r$ or $g$.

== Applications ==
Perpetuities are used as simplified models for valuing assets that are expected to generate cash flows for a very long time, or for representing the value of cash flows beyond an explicit forecast horizon.

In real estate appraisal, direct capitalisation converts an estimate of a single year's stabilised income into an indication of value by dividing by a market-derived capitalisation rate (cap rate). Under the standard stabilised-income assumption, this has the same algebraic form as valuing a level perpetuity, with the cap rate playing the role of a required return for that income stream.

In corporate finance and equity valuation, the constant-growth dividend discount model treats dividends as a growing perpetuity and expresses the share price in terms of next-period dividends, the discount rate and the growth rate. Related growing-perpetuity expressions are also used to estimate terminal value in discounted cash flow analysis once a firm is assumed to have reached stable growth.

Some financial instruments can be approximated as perpetuities. For example, shares of preferred stock with fixed dividends and no maturity date are commonly valued by discounting the dividend stream as a level perpetuity, using a required return appropriate to the risk of the dividends.

Perpetuities appear in instructional examples for endowments designed to preserve principal while distributing a regular amount indefinitely (for example, to fund a scholarship).

== Examples ==
Consols are government securities with no scheduled maturity date that pay a fixed coupon until they are redeemed by the issuer. British consols originated in the 18th century and were issued in several forms, including 4% consols in the late 1920s and early 1930s.

In the 2010s, the UK government moved to eliminate the remaining undated gilts. In October 2014 it announced the redemption of 4% Consolidated Loan (redeemed 1 February 2015), noting that the issue dated from 1927 and that cumulative interest payments since then were estimated at £1.26 billion. In December 2014 it announced the redemption of 3 1/2% War Loan at par on 9 March 2015. Further operational notices in 2015 covered additional undated and "rump" gilts redeemed later that year, and legislation provided a framework for redeeming the remaining undated government stocks.

Modern examples of "perpetual" cash-flow instruments are common in bank regulatory capital. Under the Basel III capital rules, an instrument eligible as Additional Tier 1 capital must be perpetual (no maturity date), although it may include issuer call options (subject to conditions such as a minimum period before the first call and supervisory approval). These instruments are often structured to absorb losses in stress (for example via conversion or write-down), which makes them riskier than conventional bonds despite their bond-like coupons.

Perpetuities are used to illustrate long-lived funding arrangements. Many university endowments are defined as funds whose principal is invested in perpetuity, with spending limited to investment returns under an institutional spending policy.

== See also ==
- Geometric progression
- Perpetual bond
