= Annuities in the European Union =

Under European Union law, an annuity is a financial contract which provides an income stream in return for an initial payment with specific parameters. It is the opposite of a settlement funding. A Swiss annuity is not considered a European annuity for tax reasons.

== Immediate annuity ==
An immediate annuity is an annuity for which the time between the contract date and the date of the first payment is not longer than the time interval between payments. A common use for an immediate annuity is to provide a pension to a retired person or persons.

It is a financial contract which makes a series of payments with certain characteristics:

- either level or fluctuating periodical payments
- made annually, or at more frequent intervals
- in advance or arrears
- duration may be:
  - fixed (annuity certain)
  - during the lifetime or one or more persons, possibly reduced after death of one person
  - during the lifetime but not longer than a maximum number of years
  - during the lifetime but not shorter than a minimum number of years

=== Annuity certain ===
An annuity certain pays the annuitant for a number of years designated. This option is not suitable for retirement income, as the person may outlive the number of years the annuity will pay.

=== Life annuity ===
A life annuity or lifetime immediate annuity is most often used to provide an income in old age (i.e., a pension). This type of annuity may be purchased from an insurance (Ireland and the UK, Life Assurance) company.

This annuity can be compared to a loan which is made by the purchaser to the issuing company, who then pay back the original capital with interest to the annuitant on whose life the annuity is based. The assumed period of the loan is based on the life expectancy of the annuitant but life annuities are payable until the death of the last surviving annuitant. In order to guarantee that the income continues for life, the investment relies on cross-subsidy. Because an annuity population can be expected to have a distribution of lifespans around the population's mean (average) age, those dying earlier will support those living longer (longevity insurance).

Cross-subsidy remains one of the most effective ways of spreading a given amount of capital and investment return over a lifetime without the risk of funds running out.

==== Life annuity options ====
Although this will reduce the available payments, an annuity can be arranged to continue until the death of the last survivor of two or more people. For example, many annuities continue to pay out (perhaps at a reduced rate) to the spouse of the main annuitant after his or her death, for as long as the spouse survives. The annuity paid to the spouse is called a reversionary annuity or survivorship annuity. However, if the annuitant is in good health, it may be more beneficial to select the higher payout option on their life only and purchase a life insurance policy that would pay income to the survivor.

Other features such as a minimum guaranteed payment period irrespective of death, known as life with period certain, or escalation where the payment rises by inflation or a fixed rate annually can also be purchased.

Annuities with guaranteed periods are available from most providers. In such a product, if death takes place within the guaranteed period, payments continue to be made to a nominated beneficiary.

Impaired life annuities for smokers or those with a particular illness are also available from some insurance companies. Since the life expectancy is reduced, the annuity rate is better (i.e. a higher annuity for the same initial payment). This can have the unfortunate appearance of one "betting against" the nominee.

Life annuities are priced based on the probability of the nominee surviving to receive the payments. Longevity insurance is a form of annuity that defers commencement of the payments until very late in life. A common longevity contract would be purchased at or before retirement but would not commence payments until 20 years after retirement. If the nominee dies before payments commence there is no payable benefit. This drastically reduces the cost of the annuity while still providing protection against outliving one's resources.

== Deferred annuity ==
The second usage for the term annuity came into its own during the 1970s. This is a deferred annuity and is a vehicle for accumulating savings, and eventually distributing them either as an immediate annuity or as a lump-sum payment. Note that this is different from an immediate annuity.

Under the heading of deferred annuities, there are contracts which may be similar to

- bank deposits in that they offer the buyer interest on their money and a guaranteed return of capital, or
- stock index funds or other stock funds (such as ETFs), where the growth or shrinkage of the account depends on the performance of the market.

Contracts may also be linked to other investments such as property (real estate) or government bonds, or any combination of the above selected by the investor or his advisors. All varieties of deferred annuities owned by individuals have one thing in common in many jurisdictions: any increase in account values is not taxed until those gains are withdrawn. This is also known as tax-deferred growth.

To complete the definitions here, a deferred annuity where the benefits are fixed at the outset, either in terms of a lump sum or an annuity, can be called a fixed deferred annuity. A deferred annuity that permits allocations to stock or bond funds and for which the account value is not guaranteed to stay above the initial amount invested is called a variable annuity.

Other than annuities provided by pension schemes, annuity contracts are usually issued by an insurance company. They are distributed by, and available for purchase from, duly licensed bank, stock brokerage, and insurance company representatives. Some annuities may also be purchased directly from the issuer, i.e., the insurance company writing the contract.

In a typical immediate annuity contract, an individual would pay a lump sum or a series of payments (sometimes called annuity considerations) to an insurance company, and in return pay the annuitant a series of periodic payments for the rest of their life. The exact terms of an annuity product are set out in the contract.

In common with other types of insurance contract, both immediate and deferred annuities will typically pay commission to the sales person (or advisor).

A wide variety of features have been developed by annuity companies in order to make their products more attractive. These include death benefit options and living benefit options.

== Investment considerations ==
=== Immediate annuities ===
Because immediate annuities generally provide a series of guaranteed payments, the annuity company normally matches its liabilities with government bonds and other high grade bonds, and the market yield available on these bonds largely determines the retail pricing of the annuities. (The companies are usually required by law to invest their funds in this way, to reduce the risk of default.)

These investments are generally regarded as less risky than other investments, such as those linked to the stock market, and probably offer a lower expected return. However fixed annuities do not protect the purchaser against the effects of inflation, which is a material risk.

For many elderly people, the financial risk of living longer than expected and running out of money is a bigger risk than investment risks such as exposure to a falling stock market. Immediate annuities protect against this risk.

=== Deferred annuities ===
Deferred pensions are often used as a savings vehicle by higher rate taxpayers, as in some jurisdictions they get higher rate tax relief on their pension contributions and their fund accumulates without investment returns being subject to tax. The proceeds will be taxed when they are taken as benefits, but maybe at a lower rate. Those in lower tax brackets may be told to avoid deferred pensions because they may not be able to recoup the charges made by the annuity company. (In some jurisdictions, some or all of the proceeds must by law be applied to purchase a pension.)

== Actuarial considerations ==
Actuarial formulae are used to model annuities and determine their price.

=== Payment options for immediate annuities ===
In technical language an annuity is said to be payable for an assigned status, this being a general word chosen in preference to such words as "time", "term" or "period", because it may include more readily either a term of years certain, or a life or combination of lives. The magnitude of the annuity is the sum to be paid (and received) in the course of each year. Thus, if £100 is to be received each year by a person, he is said to have "an annuity of £100". If the payments are made half-yearly, it is sometimes said that he has "a half-yearly annuity of £100"; but to avoid ambiguity, it is more commonly said he has "an annuity of £100, payable by half-yearly instalments". An annuity is considered as accruing during each instant of the status for which it is enjoyed, although it is only payable at fixed intervals. If the enjoyment of an annuity is postponed until after the lapse of a certain number of years, the annuity is said to be deferred. If an annuity, instead of being payable at the end of each year, half-year, etc., is payable in advance, it is called an annuity-due. The holder of an annuity is called an annuitant, and the person on whose life the annuity depends is called the nominee.

Upon immediate annuitization, a wide variety of options are available in the way the stream of payments is paid. If the annuity is paid over a fixed period independent of any contingency, it is known as an annuity with period certain, or just annuity certain; if it is to continue for ever, it is called a perpetuity; and if in the latter case it is not to commence until after a term of years, it is called a deferred perpetuity. An annuity depending on the continuance of an assigned life or lives would commonly be called a life annuity, but also known as a life-contingent annuity or simply lifetime annuity; but more commonly the simple term "annuity" is understood to mean a life annuity, unless the contrary is stated. The payments can also be paid over the lifetime of the nominee(s) or for a fixed period, whichever is longer. This is known as life with period certain.

A hybrid of these is when the payments stop at death, but also after a predetermined number of payments, if this is earlier: known as a temporary life annuity. The difference with the period certain annuity is that the period certain annuity will keep paying after the death of the nominee until the period is completed.

If not otherwise stated, it is always understood that an annuity is payable yearly, and that the annual payment (or rent, as it is sometimes called) is a single currency unit.

Instances of perpetuities are the dividends upon the public stocks in England, France and some other countries. Thus, although it is usual to speak of £100 consols, the reality is the yearly dividend which the government pays by quarterly instalments. The practice of the French in this is arguably more logical. In speaking of their public funds (rentes) they do not mention the ideal capital sum, but speak of the annuity or annual payment that is received by the public creditor. Other instances of perpetuities are the incomes derived from the debenture stocks of railway companies, also the feu-duties commonly payable on house property in Scotland. The number of years' purchase which the perpetual annuities granted by a government or a railway company realize in the open market, forms a very simple test of the credit of the various governments or railways.

In the United Kingdom, the income from compulsory purchase annuities purchased with pension funds or by an employer immediately on retirement (a Hancock annuity) is treated as taxable income. The income from purchased life annuities, bought by any other means, has an element which is considered return of capital, and only the excess over this is considered a gain that is subject to income tax. The element considered capital return is based on life expectancy and will therefore increase with age.

== Government incentives ==
Because of cross-subsidy and the guarantees an annuity can give against running out of income and becoming dependent on state welfare in old age, annuities often have a favourable tax treatment, which may affect how attractive they are relative to other investments.

Immediate annuities are a compulsory feature of certain pension saving schemes in some countries, where the government grants tax deductions, provided that savings are paid into a fund which can only (or mainly) be withdrawn as an annuity. The Netherlands has such schemes and United Kingdom used to until A day in 2006. From 2003 the tax deduction in the Netherlands is only allowed if, without additional savings, the old age income would be less than 70% of the current income. The French government currently honors a very unusual debt contract: an annuity that was issued in 1738 and currently yields €1.20 per year.

=== UK ===
In the United Kingdom contributions into pension savings are generally net of income tax (i.e. tax relief is available), up to certain limits. On retirement if an annuity is not purchased, retirement income up until the age of 75 can be drawn from the pension fund by using pension income withdrawal commonly known as income drawdown. This is an unsecured pension as opposed to an annuity which is a secured backed pension. Unsecured pensions operate under age-related income limits calculated by the Government Actuarial Department to prevent the fund being eroded too fast. Before A-day, individuals could vary withdrawals between 35% and 100% of a maximum limit, recalculated every three years at what was known as the triennial review. Following changes introduced by HMRC as part of the A-day legislation, individuals can now draw an income between zero and 120% of the "GAD rate". On reaching 75, the individual must then secure their pension fund by the purchase of an annuity, except that up to 25% of the fund can be taken as tax-free cash, also known as the pension commencement lump sum, or enter into an alternatively secured pension (ASP). Under an ASP arrangement the rate of income must fall between 55% and 90% of the GAD rate for a 75-year-old. The GAD rates are subject to periodic review and are based on the return of a level, single life annuity paid monthly in arrears without any guarantee or value protection for an individual in good health. These rates are in turn largely dependent on long-term gilt yields and mortality data.

Unsecured or alternatively secured pensions carry both the investment risk of the invested pension fund and mortality drag that occurs from the loss of cross-subsidy and advancing average age expectancy that occurs in the time over which annuity purchase is delayed.

== Terminable annuities ==
Terminable annuities are employed in the system of British public finance as a means of reducing the National Debt. This result is attained by substituting for a perpetual annual charge (or one lasting until the capital which it represents can be paid off en bloc), an annual charge of a larger amount, but lasting for a short term. The latter is so calculated as to pay off, during its existence, the capital which it replaces, with interest at an assumed or agreed rate, and under specified conditions. The practical effect of the substitution of a terminable annuity for an obligation of longer currency is to bind the present generation of citizens to increase its own obligations in the present and near future in order to diminish those of its successors. This end might be attained in other ways; for instance, by setting aside out of revenue a fixed annual sum for the purchase and cancellation of debt (Pitt's method, in intention), or by fixing the annual debt charge at a figure sufficient to provide a margin for reduction of the principal of the debt beyond the amount required for interest (Sir Stafford Northcote's method), or by providing an annual surplus of revenue over expenditure (the "Old Sinking Fund"), available for the same purpose. All these methods have been tried in the course of British financial history, and the second and third of them are still employed; but on the whole the method of terminable annuities has been the one preferred by chancellors of the exchequer and by Parliament.

Terminable annuities, as employed by the British government, fall under two heads:

1. Those issued to, or held by private persons;
2. those held by government departments or by funds under government control.

The important difference between these two classes is that an annuity under (1), once created, cannot be modified except with the holder's consent, i.e. is practically unalterable without a breach of public faith; whereas an annuity under (2) can, if necessary, be altered by interdepartmental arrangement under the authority of Parliament. Thus annuities of class (1) fulfil most perfectly the object of the system as explained above; while those of class (2) have the advantage that in times of emergency their operation can be suspended without any inconvenience or breach of faith, with the result that the resources of government can on such occasions be materially increased, apart from any additional taxation. For this purpose it is only necessary to retain as a charge on the income of the year a sum equal to the (smaller) perpetual charge which was originally replaced by the (larger) terminable charge, whereupon the difference between the two amounts is temporarily released, while ultimately the increased charge is extended for a period equal to that for which it is suspended.

Annuities of class (1) were first instituted in 1808, but were later regulated by the Government Annuities Act 1829 (10 Geo. 4. c. 24). They may be granted either for a specified life, or two lives, or for an arbitrary term of years; and the consideration for them may take the form either of cash or of government stock, the latter being cancelled when the annuity is set up.

Annuities (2) held by government departments date from 1863. They were created in exchange for permanent debt surrendered for cancellation, the principal operations having been effected in 1863, 1867, 1870, 1874, 1883 and 1899.

Annuities of this class do not affect the public at all, except of course in their effect on the market for government securities. They are merely financial operations between the government, in its capacity as the banker of savings banks and other funds, and itself, in the capacity of custodian of the national finances. Savings bank depositors are not concerned with the manner in which government invests their money, their rights being confined to the receipt of interest and the repayment of deposits upon specified conditions. The case is, however, different as regards forty millions of consols (included in the above figures), belonging to suitors in chancery, which were cancelled and replaced by a terminable annuity in 1883. As the liability to the suitors in that case was for a specified amount of stock, special arrangements were made to ensure the ultimate replacement of the precise amount of stock cancelled.

== Annuity calculations ==
The mathematical theory of life annuities is based upon a knowledge of the rate of mortality among mankind in general, or among the particular class of persons on whose lives the annuities depend, see actuarial present value. In practice simply tables may be used, which vary in different places, but which are easily accessible.

== History of calculating life annuities or pensions ==
Abraham Demoivre, in his Annuities on Lives, put forth a very simple law of mortality: out of 86 children born alive, 1 will die every year until the last dies between the ages of 85 and 86. This law agreed sufficiently well at the Middle Ages of life with the mortality deduced from the best observations of his time; but, as observations became more exact, the approximation was found to be not sufficiently close. This was particularly the case when it was desired to obtain the value of joint life, contingent or other complicated benefits. Therefore, Demoivre's law is devoid of practical utility. No simple formula has sufficient accuracy.

The rate of mortality at each age is, therefore, in practice usually determined by a series of figures deduced from observation; and the value of an annuity at any age is found from these numbers by means of a series of arithmetical calculations.

The first writer who is known to have attempted to obtain, on correct mathematical principles, the value of a life annuity, was Jan De Witt, grand pensionary of Holland and West Friesland. Our knowledge of his writings on the subject is derived from two papers contributed by Frederick Hendriks to the Assurance Magazine, vol. ii. (1852) p. 222, and vol. in. p. 93. The former of these contains a translation of De Witt's report upon the value of life annuities, which was prepared in consequence of the resolution passed by the states-general, on 25 April 1671, to negotiate funds by life annuities, and which was distributed to the members on 30 July 1671. The latter contains the translation of a number of letters addressed by De Witt to Burgomaster Johan Hudde, bearing dates from September 1670 to October 1671. The existence of De Witt's report was well known among his contemporaries, and Hendriks collected a number of extracts from various authors referring to it; but the report is not contained in any collection of his works extant, and had been entirely lost for 180 years, until Hendriks discovered it among the state archives of Holland in company with the letters to Hudde. It was the very first document on the subject that was ever written.

=== De Witt's mortality table ===
TABLE OF MORTALITY—HM, HEALTHY LIVES—MALE. Number Living and Dying at each Age, out of 10,000 entering at Age 10.
Age	Living	Dying	Age	Living	Dying
10	10,000	79	54	6791	129
11	9,921	0	55	6662	153
12	9,921	40	56	6509	150
13	9,881	35	57	6359	152
14	9,846	40	58	6207	156
15	9,806	22	59	6051	153
16	9,784	0	60	5898	184
17	9,784	41	61	5714	186
18	9,743	59	62	5528	191
19	9,684	68	63	5337	200
20	9,616	56	64	5137	206
21	9,560	67	65	4931	215
22	9,493	59	66	4716	220
23	9,434	73	67	4496	220
24	9,361	64	68	4276	237
25	9,297	48	69	4039	246
26	9,249	64	70	3793	213
27	9,185	60	71	3580	222
28	9,125	71	72	3358	268
29	9,054	67	73	3090	243
30	8,987	74	74	2847	300
31	8,913	65	75	2547	241
32	8,848	74	76	2306	245
33	8,774	73	77	2061	224
34	8,701	76	78	1837	226
35	8,625	71	79	1611	219
36	8,554	75	80	1392	196
37	8,479	81	81	1196	191
38	8,398	87	82	1005	173
39	8,311	88	83	832	172
40	8,223	81	84	660	119
41	8,142	85	85	541	117
42	8,057	87	86	424	92
43	7,970	84	87	332	72
44	7,886	93	88	260	74
45	7,793	97	89	186	36
46	7,696	96	90	150	34
47	7,600	107	91	116	36
48	7,493	106	92	80	36
49	7,387	113	93	44	29
50	7,274	120	94	15	0
51	7,154	124	95	15	5
52	7,030	120	96	10	10
53	6,910	119			

It appears that it had long been the practice in Holland for life annuities to be granted to nominees of any age, in the constant proportion of double the rate of interest allowed on stock; that is to say, if the towns were borrowing money at 6%, they would be willing to grant a life annuity at 12%, and so on. De Witt states that "annuities have been sold, even in the present century, first at six years' purchase, then at seven and eight; and that the majority of all life annuities now current at the country's expense were obtained at nine years' purchase"; but that the price had been increased in the course of a few years from eleven years' purchase to twelve, and from twelve to fourteen. He also states that the rate of interest had been successively reduced from 6-¼% to 5%, and then to 4%. The principal object of his report is to prove that, taking interest at 4%, a life annuity was worth at least sixteen years' purchase; and, in fact, that an annuitant purchasing an annuity for the life of a young and healthy nominee at sixteen years' purchase, made an excellent bargain.

He argues that it is more to the advantage, both of the country and of the private investor, that the public loans should be raised by way of grant of life annuities rather than perpetual annuities. It appears from De Witt's correspondence with Hudde, that the rate of mortality assumed was deduced from the mortality that had actually prevailed among the nominees on whose lives annuities had been granted in former years. De Witt appears to have come to the conclusion that the probability of death is the same in any half-year from the age of 3 to 53 inclusive; that in the next ten years, from 53 to 63, the probability is greater in the ratio of 3 to 2; that in the next ten years, from 63 to 73, it is greater in the ratio of 2 to 1; and in the next seven years, from 73 to 80, it is greater in the ratio of 3 to 1; and he places the limit of human life at 80. If a mortality table of the usual form is deduced from these suppositions, out of 212 persons alive at the age of 3, 2 will die every year up to 53, 3 in each of the ten years from 53 to 63, 4 in each of the next ten years from 63 to 73, and 6 in each of the next seven years from 73 to 80, when all will be dead.

De Witt calculates the value of an annuity in the following way. Assume that annuities on 10,000 lives each ten years of age, which satisfy the Hm mortality table, have been purchased. Of these nominees 79 will die before attaining the age of 11, and no annuity payment will be made in respect of them; none will die between the ages of 11 and 12, so that annuities will be paid for one year on 9921 lives; 40 attain the age of 12 and die before 13, so that two payments will be made with respect to these lives. Reasoning in this way we see that the annuities on 35 of the nominees will be payable for three years; on 40 for four years, and so on. Proceeding thus to the end of the table, 15 nominees attain the age of 95, 5 of whom die before the age of 96, so that 85 payments will be paid in respect of these 5 lives. Of the survivors all die before attaining the age of 97, so that the annuities on these lives will be payable for 86 years. Having previously calculated a table of the values of annuities certain for every number of years up to 86, the value of all the annuities on the 10,000 nominees will be found by taking 40 times the value of an annuity for 2 years, 35 times the value of an annuity for 3 years, and so on—the last term being the value of 10 annuities for 86 years—and adding them together; and the value of an annuity on one of the nominees will then be found by dividing by 10,000. Before leaving the subject of De Witt, we may mention that we find in the correspondence a distinct suggestion of the law of mortality that bears the name of Demoivre. In De Witt's letter, dated 27 October 1671 (Ass. Mag. vol. iii. p. 107), he speaks of a "provisional hypothesis" suggested by Hudde, that out of 80 young lives (who, from the context, may be taken as of the age 6) about 1 dies annually. In strictness, therefore, the law in question might be more correctly termed Hudde's than Demoivre's.

De Witt's report being thus of the nature of an unpublished state paper, although it contributed to its author's reputation, did not contribute to advance the exact knowledge of the subject; and the author to whom the credit must be given of first showing how to calculate the value of an annuity on correct principles is Edmund Halley. He gave the first approximately correct mortality table (deduced from the records of the numbers of deaths and baptisms in the city of Breslau), and showed how it might be employed to calculate the value of an annuity on the life of a nominee of any age.

Previously to Halley's time, and apparently for many years subsequently, all dealings with life annuities were based upon mere conjectural estimates. The earliest known reference to any estimate of the value of life annuities rose out of the requirements of the Falcidian law, which in 40 B.C. was adopted in the Roman Empire, and which declared that a testator should not give more than three-fourths of his property in legacies, so that at least one-fourth must go to his legal representatives. It is easy to see how it would occasionally become necessary, while this law was in force, to value life annuities charged upon a testator's estate. Aemilius Macer (A.D. 230) states that the method which had been in common use at that time was as follows:--From the earliest age until 30 take 30 years' purchase, and for each age after 30 deduct 1 year. It is obvious that no consideration of compound interest can have entered into this estimate; and it is easy to see that it is equivalent to assuming that all persons who attain the age of 30 will certainly live to the age of 60, and then certainly die. Compared with this estimate, that which was propounded by the praetorian prefect Ulpian was a great improvement. His table is as follows:

Age	Years' purchase	Age	Years' purchase
Birth – 20	30	45 – 46	14
20 – 25	28	46 – 47	13
25 – 30	25	47 – 48	12
30 – 35	22	48 – 49	11
35 – 40	20	49 – 50	10
40 – 41	19	50 – 55	9
41 – 42	18	55 – 60	7
42 – 43	17	60 and upwards	
43 – 44	16		
44 – 45	15		

Here also we have no reason to suppose that the element of interest was taken into consideration; and the assumption, that between the ages of 40 and 50 each addition of a year to the nominee's age diminishes the value of the annuity by one year's purchase, is equivalent to assuming that there is no probability of the nominee dying between the ages of 40 and 50. Considered, however, simply as a table of the average duration of life, the values are fairly accurate. At all events, no more correct estimate appears to have been arrived at until the close of the 17th century.

The mathematics of annuities has been very fully treated in Demoivre's Treatise on Annuities (1725); Simpson's Doctrine of Annuities and Reversions (1742); P. Gray, Tables and Formulae; Baily's Doctrine of Life Annuities; there are also innumerable compilations of Valuation Tables and Interest Tables, by means of which the value of an annuity at any age and any rate of interest may be found. See also the article interest, and especially that on insurance.

Commutation tables, aptly so named in 1840 by Augustus De Morgan (see his paper "On the Calculation of Single Life Contingencies," Assurance Magazine, xii. 328), show the proportion in which a benefit due at one age ought to be changed, so as to retain the same value and be due at another age. The earliest known specimen of a commutation table is contained in William Dale's Introduction to the Study of the Doctrine of Annuities, published in 1772. A full account of this work is given by F. Hendriks in the second number of the Assurance Magazine, pp. 15–17. William Morgan's Treatise on Assurances, 1779, also contains a commutation table. Morgan gives the table as furnishing a convenient means of checking the correctness of the values of annuities found by the ordinary process. It may be assumed that he was aware that the table might be used for the direct calculation of annuities; but he appears to have been ignorant of its other uses.

The first author who fully developed the powers of the table was John Nicholas Tetens, a native of Schleswig, who in 1785, while professor of philosophy and mathematics at Kiel, published in the German language an Introduction to the Calculation of Life Annuities and Assurances. This work appears to have been quite unknown in England until F. Hendriks gave, in the first number of the Assurance Magazine, pp. 1–20 (Sept. 1850), an account of it, with a translation of the passages describing the construction and use of the commutation table, and a sketch of the author's life and writings, to which we refer the reader who desires fuller information. It may be mentioned here that Tetens also gave only a specimen table, apparently not imagining that persons using his work would find it extremely useful to have a series of commutation tables, calculated and printed ready for use.

The use of the commutation table was independently developed in England-apparently between the years 1788 and 1811—by George Barrett, of Petworth, Sussex, who was the son of a yeoman farmer, and was himself a village schoolmaster, and afterwards farm steward or bailiff. It has been usual to consider Barrett as the originator in England of the method of calculating the values of annuities by means of a commutation table, and this method is accordingly sometimes called Barrett's method. (It is also called the commutation method and the columnar method.) Barrett's method of calculating annuities was explained by him to Francis Baily in 1811, and was first made known to the world in a paper written by the latter and read before the Royal Society in 1812.

By what has been universally considered an unfortunate error of judgment, this paper was not recommended by the council of the Royal Society to be printed, but it was given by Baily as an appendix to the second issue (in 1813) of his work on life annuities and assurances. Barrett had calculated extensive tables, and with Baily's aid attempted to get them published by subscription, but without success; and the only printed tables calculated according to his manner, besides the specimen tables given by Baily, are the tables contained in Babbage's Comparative View of the various Institutions for the Assurance of Lives, 1826.

In 1825 Griffith Davies published his Tables of Life Contingencies, a work which contains, among others, two tables, which are confessedly derived from Baily's explanation of Barrett's tables.

Those who desire to pursue the subject further can refer to the appendix to Baily's Life Annuities and Assurances, De Morgan's paper "On the Calculation of Single Life Contingencies," Assurance Magazine, xii. 348-349; Gray's Tables and Formulae chap. viii.; the preface to Davies's Treatise on Annuities; also Hendriks's papers in the Assurance Magazine, No. 1, p. 1, and No. 2, p. 12; and in particular De Morgan's "Account of a Correspondence between Mr George Barrett and Mr Francis Baily," in the Assurance Magazine, vol. iv. p. 185.

The principal commutation tables published in England are contained in the following works:--David Jones, Value of Annuities and Reversionary Payments, issued in parts by the Useful Knowledge Society, completed in 1843; Jenkin Jones, New Rate of Mortality, 1843; G. Davies, Treatise on Annuities, 1825 (issued 1855); David Chisholm, Commutation Tables, 1858; Nelson's Contributions to Vital Statistics, 1857; Jardine Henry, Government Life Annuity Commutation Tables, 1866 and 1873; Institute of Actuaries Life Tables, 1872; R. P. Hardy, Valuation Tables, 1873; and Dr William Farr's contributions to the sixth (1844), twelfth (1849), and twentieth (1857) Reports of the Registrar General in England (English Tables, I. 2), and to the English Life Table, 1864.

The theory of annuities may be further studied in the discussions in the English Journal of the Institute of Actuaries. The institute was founded in 1848, the first sessional meeting being held in January 1849. Its establishment has contributed in various ways to promote the study of the theory of life contingencies. Among these may be specified the following:--Before it was formed, students of the subject worked for the most part alone, and without any concert; and when any person had made an improvement in the theory, it had little chance of becoming publicly known unless he wrote a formal treatise on the whole subject. But the formation of the institute led to much greater interchange of opinion among actuaries, and afforded them a ready means of making known to their professional associates any improvements, real or supposed, that they thought they had made. Again, the discussions which follow the reading of papers before the institute have often served, first, to bring out into bold relief differences of opinion that were previously unsuspected, and afterwards to soften down those differences,--to correct extreme opinions in every direction, and to bring about a greater agreement of opinion on many important subjects. In no way, probably, have the objects of the institute been so effectually advanced as by the publication of its Journal. The first number of this work, which was originally called the Assurance Magazine, appeared in September 1850, and it has been continued quarterly down to the present time. It was originated by the public spirit of two well-known actuaries (Mr Charles Jellicoe and Mr Samuel Brown), and was adopted as the organ of the Institute of Actuaries in 1852, and called the Assurance Magazine and Journal of the Institute of Actuaries, Mr Jellicoe continuing to be the editor,--a post he held until the year 1867, when he was succeeded by Mr T. B. Sprague (who contributed to the 9th edition of this Encyclopaedia an elaborate article on "Annuities," on which the above account is based). The name was again changed in 1866, the words "Assurance Magazine" being dropped; but in the following year it was considered desirable to resume these, for the purpose of showing the continuity of the publication, and it is now called the Journal of the Institute of Actuaries and Assurance Magazine. This work contains not only the papers read before the institute (to which have been appended of late years short abstracts of the discussions on them), and many original papers which were unsuitable for reading, together with correspondence, but also reprints of many papers published elsewhere, which from various causes had become difficult of access to the ordinary reader, among which may be specified various papers which originally appeared in the Philosophical Transactions, the Philosophical Magazine, the Mechanics' Magazine, and the Companion to the Almanac; also translations of various papers from the French, German, and Danish. Among the useful objects which the continuous publication of the Journal of the institute has served, we may specify in particular two:--that any supposed improvement in the theory was effectually submitted to the criticisms of the whole actuarial profession, and its real value speedily discovered; and that any real improvement, whether great or small, being placed on record, successive writers have been able, one after the other, to take it up and develop it, each commencing where the previous one had left off.
