= Weighted-average life =

Average time to repay loan captital

In finance, the weighted-average life (WAL) of an amortizing loan or amortizing bond, also called average life, is the weighted average of the times of the principal repayments: it's the average time until a dollar of principal is repaid.

In a formula,

$$\text{WAL} = \sum_{i=1}^n \frac {P_i}{P} t_i,$$

where:

- $P$ is the (total) principal,
- $P_i$ is the principal repayment that is included in payment $i$, hence
- $\frac{P_i}{P}$ is the fraction of the total principal that is included in payment $i$, and
- $t_i$ is the time (in years) from the calculation date to payment $i$.

If desired, $t_i$ can be expanded as $\frac{1}{12}(i+\alpha-1)$ for a monthly bond, where $\alpha$ is the fraction of a month between settlement date and first cash flow date.

== WAL of classes of loans ==
In loans that allow prepayment, the WAL cannot be computed from the amortization schedule alone; one must also make assumptions about the prepayment and default behavior, and the quoted WAL will be an estimate. The WAL is usually computed from a single cash-flow sequence. Occasionally, a simulated average life may be computed from multiple cash-flow scenarios, such as those from an option-adjusted spread model.

== Related concepts ==
WAL should not be confused with the following distinct concepts:

Bond duration
Bond duration is the weighted-average time to receive the discounted present values of all the cash flows (including both principal and interest), while WAL is the weighted-average time to receive simply the principal payments (not including interest, and not discounting). For an amortizing loan with equal payments, the WAL will be higher than the duration, as the early payments are weighted towards interest, while the later payments are weighted towards principal, and further, taking present value (in duration) discounts the later payments.
Time until 50% of the principal has been repaid
WAL is a mean, while "50% of the principal repaid" is a median; see difference between mean and median. Since principal outstanding is a concave function (of time) for a flat payment amortizing loan, less than half the principal will have been paid off at the WAL. Intuitively, this is because most of the principal repayment happens at the end. Formally, the distribution of repayments has negative skew: the small principal repayments at the beginning drag down the WAL (mean) more than they reduce the median.
Weighted-average maturity (WAM)
WAM is an average of the maturity dates of multiple loans, not an average of principal repayments.

== Applications ==
WAL is a measure that can be useful in credit risk analysis on fixed income securities, bearing in mind that the main credit risk of a loan is the risk of loss of principal. All else equal, a bond with principal outstanding longer (i.e., longer WAL) has greater credit risk than a bond with shorter WAL. In particular, WAL is often used as the basis for yield comparisons in I-spread calculations.

WAL should not be used to estimate a bond's price-sensitivity to interest-rate fluctuations, as WAL includes only the principal cash flows, omitting the interest payments. Instead, one should use bond duration, which incorporates all the cash flows.

== Examples ==
The WAL of a bullet loan (non-amortizing) is exactly the tenor, as the principal is repaid precisely at maturity.

On a 30-year amortizing loan, paying equal amounts monthly, one has the following WALs, for the given annual interest rates (and corresponding monthly payments per $100,000 principal balance, calculated via an amortization calculator and the formulas below relating amortized payments, total interest, and WAL):

| Rate | Payment | Total Interest | WAL Calculation | WAL |
|---|---|---|---|---|
| 4% | $477.42 | $71,871.20 | $71,871.20/($100,000*4%) | 17.97 |
| 8% | $733.76 | $164,153.60 | $164,153.60/($100,000*8%) | 20.52 |
| 12% | $1,028.61 | $270,299.60 | $270,229.60/($100,000*12%) | 22.52 |

Note that as the interest rate increases, WAL increases, since the principal payments become increasingly back-loaded. WAL is independent of the principal balance, though payments and total interest are proportional to principal.

For a coupon of 0%, where the principal amortizes linearly, the WAL is exactly half the tenor plus half a payment period, because principal is repaid in arrears (at the end of the period). So for a 30-year 0% loan, paying monthly, the WAL is $15 + 1/24 \approx 15.04$ years.

== Total Interest ==
WAL allows one to easily compute the total interest payments, given by:

$$\text{WAL} \times r \times P,$$

where r is the annual interest rate and P is the initial principal.

This can be understood intuitively as: "The average dollar of principal is outstanding for the WAL, hence the interest on the average dollar is $\text{WAL} \times r$, and now one multiplies by the principal to get total interest payments."

=== Proof ===
More rigorously, one can derive the result as follows. To ease exposition, assume that payments are monthly, so periodic interest rate is annual interest rate divided by 12, and time $t_i = i/12$ (time in years is period number in months, over 12).

Then:

$$\begin{align}
\text{WAL}                   &= \sum_{i=1}^n \frac {P_i}{P} t_i\\
\text{WAL} \times P          &= \sum_{i=1}^n P_i t_i
&&= \sum_{i=1}^n P_i \frac{i}{12}\\
\text{WAL} \times P \times r &= \sum_{i=1}^n iP_i \frac{r}{12}
&&= \frac{r}{12} \sum_{i=1}^n iP_i
\end{align}$$

Total interest is

$$\sum_{i=1}^n Q_i \frac{r}{12} =  \frac{r}{12}\sum_{i=1}^n Q_i,$$

where $Q_i$ is the principal outstanding at the beginning of period i (it's the principal on which the i interest payment is based). The statement reduces to showing that $\sum_{i=1}^n iP_i=\sum_{i=1}^n Q_i$. Both of these quantities are the time-weighted total principal of the bond (in periods), and they are simply different ways of slicing it: the $iP_i$ sum counts how long each dollar of principal is outstanding (it slices horizontally), while the $Q_i$ counts how much principal is outstanding at each point in time (it slices vertically).

Working backwards, $Q_n=P_n, Q_{n-1}=P_n+P_{n-1}$, and so forth: the principal outstanding when k periods remain is exactly the sum of the next k principal payments. The principal paid off by the last (nth) principal payment is outstanding for all n periods, while the principal paid off by the second to last ((n − 1)th) principal payment is outstanding for n − 1 periods, and so forth. Using this, the sums can be re-arranged to be equal.

For instance, if the principal amortized as $100, $80, $50 (with paydowns of $20, $30, $50), then the sum would on the one hand be $20+2\cdot 30 + 3\cdot 50=230$, and on the other hand would be $100+80+50=230$. This is demonstrated in the following table, which shows the amortization schedule, broken up into principal repayments, where each column is a $Q_i$, and each row is $iP_i$:

| 230 | 100 | 80 | 50 |
|---|---|---|---|
| 1 × 20 | 20 | | |
| 2 × 30 | 30 | 30 | |
| 3 × 50 | 50 | 50 | 50 |

=== Computing WAL from amortized payment ===
The above can be reversed: given the terms (principal, tenor, rate) and amortized payment A, one can compute the WAL without knowing the amortization schedule. The total payments are $An$ and the total interest payments are $An-P$, so the WAL is:

$$\text{WAL} = \frac{An-P}{Pr}$$

Similarly, the total interest as percentage of principal is given by $\text{WAL} \times r$:

$$\text{WAL} \times r = \frac{An-P}{P}$$

== See also ==
- Amortization calculator
- Amortization schedule
- Amortizing loan

== Notes and references ==
- Fabozzi, Frank J. (2000), The handbook of fixed income securities, ISBN 0-87094-985-3
