= Accumulation function =

In actuarial mathematics, the accumulation function a(t) is a function of time t expressing the ratio of the value at time t (future value) and the initial investment (present value). It is used in interest theory.

Thus a(0) = 1 and the value at time t is given by:

$$A(t) = A(0) \cdot a(t).$$

where the initial investment is $A(0).$

For various interest-accumulation protocols, the accumulation function is as follows (with i denoting the interest rate and d denoting the discount rate):

- simple interest: $a(t)=1+t \cdot i$
- compound interest: $a(t)=(1+i)^t$
- simple discount: $a(t) = 1+\frac{td}{1-d}$
- compound discount: $a(t) = (1-d)^{-t}$

In the case of a positive rate of return, as in the case of interest, the accumulation function is an increasing function.

== Variable rate of return ==
The logarithmic or continuously compounded return, sometimes called force of interest, is a function of time defined as follows:

$$\delta_{t}=\frac{a'(t)}{a(t)}\,$$

which is the rate of change with time of the natural logarithm of the accumulation function.

Conversely:

$$a(t)= \exp \left( \int_0^t \delta_u\, du \right),$$

reducing to

$$a(t)=e^{t \delta}$$

for constant $\delta$.

The effective annual percentage rate at any time is:

$$r(t) = e^{\delta_t} - 1$$

== See also ==
- Time value of money
