= Annual percentage yield =

Financial term

Annual percentage yield (APY) is a normalized representation of an interest rate, based on a compounding period of one year. APY figures allow a reasonable, single-point comparison of different offerings with varying compounding schedules. However, it does not account for the possibility of account fees affecting the net gain. APY generally refers to the rate paid to a depositor by a financial institution, while the analogous annual percentage rate (APR) refers to the rate paid to a financial institution by a borrower.

To promote financial products that do not involve debt, banks and other firms will often quote the APY (as opposed to the APR because the APY represents the customer receiving a higher return at the end of the term). For example, a certificate of deposit that has a 4.65% APR, compounded monthly, would instead be quoted as a 4.75% APY.

== Equation ==
One common mathematical definition of APY uses this effective interest rate formula, but the precise usage may depend on local laws.

$$\text{APY} = \left(1 + \frac {i_\text{nom}} {N} \right)^N - 1,$$

where

$i_\text{nom}$ is the nominal interest rate and
$N$ is the number of compounding periods per year.

For large N we have

$$\text{APY} \approx e^{i_\text{nom}} - 1,$$

where e is the base of natural logarithms (the formula follows the definition of e as a limit). This is a reasonable approximation if the compounding is daily. Also, a nominal interest rate and its corresponding APY are very nearly equal when they are small. For example (fixing some large N), a nominal interest rate of 100% would have an APY of approximately 171%, whereas 5% corresponds to 5.12%, and 1% corresponds to 1.005%.

== United States ==
For financial institutions in the United States, the calculation of the APY and the related annual percentage yield earned are regulated by the FDIC Truth in Savings Act of 1991:

ANNUAL PERCENTAGE YIELD. — The term "annual percentage yield" means the total amount of interest that would be received on a $100 deposit, based on the annual rate of simple interest and the frequency of compounding for a 365-day period, expressed as a percentage calculated by a method which shall be prescribed by the Board in regulations.

For account disclosures and advertising, Regulation DD gives the following general formula for APY:

$$\text{APY} = 100 \left[ \left(1 + \frac{\text{interest}}{\text{principal}} \right)^{365 / \text{days in term}} - 1 \right]$$

Algebraically, this is equivalent to

$$\text{interest} = \text{principal} \left[ \left( \frac{\text{APY}}{100} + 1 \right)^{\text{days in term}/365} - 1 \right].$$

Here

"principal" is the amount of funds assumed to have been deposited at the beginning of the account,
"interest" is the total dollar amount of interest earned on the Principal for the term of the account,
"days in term" is the actual number of days in the term of the account.

== See also ==
- Annual equivalent rate
- Compound interest
- Effective interest rate
