= Effective rate =

Effective rate may refer to:

- Effective tax rate
- Effective interest rate
