= E-folding =

Time interval in science

In science, e-folding is the time interval in which an exponentially growing quantity increases or decreases by a factor of e; it is the base-e analog of doubling time. This term is often used in many areas of science, such as in atmospheric chemistry, medicine, theoretical physics, and cosmology.

In cosmology the e-folding time scale is the proper time in which the length of a patch of space or spacetime increases by the factor e.

In finance, the logarithmic return or continuously compounded return, also known as force of interest, is the reciprocal of the e-folding time.

The process of evolving to equilibrium is often characterized by a time scale called the e-folding time, τ. This time is used for processes which evolve exponentially toward a final state (equilibrium). In other words, if we examine an observable, X, associated with a system, (temperature or density, for example) then after a time, τ, the initial difference between the initial value of the observable and the equilibrium value, ΔX_{i}, will have decreased to ΔX_{i} /e where the number e ≈ 2.71828.

$$T_e = \frac{T_d}{\ln(2)} = \frac{t}{\ln({N(t)}/{N(0)})} = \frac{t}{\ln(1+r/100)}$$

- T_{e} e-folding time
- N(t) amount at time t
- N(0) initial amount
- T_{d} doubling time
- ln(2) ≈ 0.693 natural logarithm of 2
- r% growth rate in time t

== Example of lifetime as e-folding time ==
The concept of e-folding time may be used in the analysis of kinetics. Consider a chemical species A, which decays into another chemical species, B. We could depict this as an equation:

$${\rm A} \rightarrow {\rm B}$$

Let us assume that this reaction follows first order kinetics, meaning that the conversion of A into B depends only on the concentration of A, and the rate constant which dictates the velocity at which this happens, k. We could write the following reaction to describe this first order kinetic process:

$$\frac{d[{\rm A}]}{dt}=-k[{\rm A}]$$

This ordinary differential equation states that a change (in this case the disappearance) of the concentration of A, d[A]/dt, is equal to the rate constant k multiplied by the concentration of A. Consider what the units of k would be. On the left hand side, we have a concentration divided by a unit of time. The units for k would need to allow for these to be replicated on the right hand side. For this reason, the units of k, here, would be 1/time.

Because this is a linear, homogeneous and separable differential equation, we may separate the terms such that the equation becomes:

$$\frac{d[{\rm A}]}{[{\rm A}]} = -k \,dt$$

We may then integrate both sides of this equation, which results in the inclusion of the constant e:

$$\begin{align}
& \int_{[{\rm A}]_i}^{[{\rm A}]_f} \frac{d[{\rm A}]}{[{\rm A}]} = \int_{t=0}^t -k \, dt \\[6pt]
& \ln[{\rm A}]_f - \ln[{\rm A}]_i = -kt - k(0) \\[6pt]
& \ln\frac{[{\rm A}]_f}{[{\rm A}]_i} = -kt \\[6pt]
& \frac{[{\rm A}]_f}{[{\rm A}]_i} = e^{-kt}
\end{align}$$

where [A]_{f} and [A]_{i} are the final and initial concentrations of A. Upon comparing the ratio on the left hand side to the equation on the right hand side, we conclude that the ratio between the final and initial concentrations follows an exponential function, of which e is the base.

As mentioned above, the units for k are inverse time. If we were to take the reciprocal of this, we would be left with units of time. For this reason, we often state that the lifetime of a species that undergoes first order decay is equal to the reciprocal of k. Consider, now, what would happen if we were to set the time, t, to the reciprocal of the rate constant, k, i.e. t = 1/k. This would yield

$$\frac{[{\rm A}]_f}{[{\rm A}]_i} = e^{-k\left(\frac 1 k \right)} = e^{-1} = \frac 1 e \approx 0.37$$

This states that after one lifetime (1/k), the ratio of final to initial concentrations is equal to about 0.37. Stated another way, after one lifetime, we have

$$\frac{[{\rm A}]_f}{[{\rm A}]_i} \approx \frac{37}{100} = 37\%$$

which means that we have lost (1 − 0.37 = 0.63) 63% of A, with only 37% left. With this, we now know that if we have 1 lifetime passed, we have gone through 1 "e-folding". What would 2 "e-foldings" look like? After two lifetimes, we would have t = 1/k + 1/k = 2/k, which would result in

$$\frac{[{\rm A}]_f}{[{\rm A}]_i} = e^{-k\left(\frac 2 k \right)} = e^{-2} = \frac 1 {e^2} \approx 0.14 = 14\%$$

which says that only about 14% of A remains. It is in this manner that e-folding lends us an easy way to describe the number of lifetimes that have passed. After 1 lifetime, we have 1/e remaining. After 2 lifetimes, we have 1/e^{2} remaining. One lifetime, therefore, is one e-folding time, which is the most descriptive way of stating the decay.

== See also ==
- Doubling time
