= Average life =

Average life may refer to:

- Average life span, statistical life expectancy for a certain population
- Exponential decay#Mean lifetime, average survival time in an exponentially decreasing set
- Weighted-average life, loan repayment timing
