= Loan receivable =

Loan receivable is a banking term for an asset account that shows amounts owed by borrowers. The lender's ledger details all unpaid amounts from borrowers. Loans receivable are handled logically and transparently, like other accounting processes.

The balance sheet shows loans receivable as current assets if they are repaid within one year. Otherwise, they are non-current assets and listed lower.

== Measurement ==
=== United States' Generally Accepted Accounting Principles (GAAP) ===
Loan receivables are classified as either held for sale (HFS) or held for investment (HFI) based on management's intent. If a loan receivable is HFS, it is measured at the lower of cost or fair value. Meanwhile, if it is HFI, it is measured at amortized cost.

=== International Financial Reporting Standards (IFRS) ===
According to IFRS 9, if a financial asset is held with the intention of collecting contractual cash flows on specified dates, and those cash flows are solely payments of principal and interest, then the asset should be measured at amortized cost. Accordingly, a loan receivable is measured at amortized cost using the effective interest method.

== Reporting under U.S. GAAP ==
=== Held for investment ===
Loans held for investment are shown on the balance sheet at their amortized cost basis. This basis includes adjustments for interest, fees, cash collection, write-offs, and fair value hedge accounting. Additional information is provided about credit losses and hedging relationships.

=== Held for sale ===
When a reporting entity creates or buys a loan intending to sell it, the loan should be classified as held for sale. Management must confirm their ability and intent to hold or sell loan receivables. A loan is classified as held for sale after the decision to sell it is made. A part of a loan can also be designated as held for sale. If a loan classified as held for sale cannot be sold, it stays in that classification until a decision is made not to sell it, while meeting the criteria for classification as Held For Investment (HFI), at which point it should move to the HFI portfolio.
