= Representative APR =

A Representative APR is a financial service concept in the United Kingdom and the European Union in which credit or loan interest rates quoted through advertising media are required to take into account all charges associated with a product, in addition to the interest rate.

== History ==
For years, financial services companies in the United Kingdom had been required to quote an Annual Percentage Rate (APR) in any credit terms or advertisements. Up until 2010, all businesses had to comply with the UK Consumer Credit (Advertisement) Regulations 2004 (2004 Regulations).

However, all European Union member states adopted a new Directive in April 2008. This was implemented in the UK by the Consumer Credit (EU Directive) Regulations 2010, which came into force for all UK companies on 1 February 2011. While the Directive is similar to the existing policies adopted in the UK, there are a couple of major changes. One of the most important of these is introduction of a ‘Representative APR’.

== What the rules say ==
The Department for Business, Skills and Innovation (BSI) is clear on what the new Directive means for financial services providers and consumers in the UK. The BSI states:

“If an advertisement includes an interest rate or any amount relating to the cost of credit, it must also include a representative example. This must contain certain standard information including a representative APR. The example must be clear and concise and must be more prominent than the information that triggered the inclusion of the example.”

== Products the rules apply to ==
The new Directive applies to advertisements and credit agreements for all loans to consumers under £60,260 excluding:

- agreements secured on land
- business loans (certified)
- investments regulated by the FSA

== Definition of ‘representative APR’ ==
The APR for financial services products often varies from customer to customer. This is particularly true if loan or credit card rates are determined by an individual's income or credit rating.

In addition, the problem with the current way of working out an APR is that it often doesn't take into account certain fees, such as credit card balance transfer fees or annual charges.

So, in instances where the APR for a financial product can vary, the APR that is stated on an advertisement must represent the business that the financial services provider expects to come from that advert. A representative APR will also take into account other charges associated with the product (in addition to the interest rate) and will be displayed within the Representative Example.

A company works out its ‘typical’ APR by taking into account past business that has arisen from advertising similar products, ideally over the previous 12 months. The Financial Services Authority (FSA) suggests to companies that they “list the APRs your customers have paid over the past 12 months. The representative APR you state in your advert should not be less than the APR paid by at least 66% of consumers on the list.”

However, from 1 February 2011, this calculation changed. The BSI reports that: “The Representative APR must reflect at least 51% of business expected to result from the advertisement. The standard information must be representative of agreements to which the Representative APR applies.”

A representative APR will be based on a credit limit of £1,200 (unless known to be lower).

== Additional services and security ==
Another subtle but important change to the rules now make it essential for financial services providers to display, in prominent text, whether there are any obligations on a consumer to enter into another contract (for example, if you have to take compulsory insurance products with a mortgage loan). In this situation, the cost must be shown with:

- no less prominence than standard information
- the representative APR

The nature of any security must also be specified.
