= Representative example =

A representative example is a term used in UK financial advertising regulations that aim to show consumers the typical costs associated with a product being advertised. The representative example must be provided when any financial services provider advertising a product, whether it is a credit card, loan or mortgage.

The term was introduced when six sets of regulations come into force from 1 February 2011 as a result of the UK government's implementation of the 2008 European Union Consumer Credit Directive which replaces the previous Consumer Credit Directive.

== History ==
Until 2010, any financial services provider advertising a product in the UK, whether it is a credit card, loan or mortgage, have had to comply with the Consumer Credit (Advertisement) Regulations 2004 (2004 Regulations).

However, from 1 February 2011, important changes come into effect when six sets of regulations which come into force based on the European Union Consumer Credit Directive.

While there were several subtle but important changes to the way financial products were advertised, one of the most important developments was the need for companies to include a representative example.

== When it must be provided ==
The Department for Business, Innovation and Skills (BIS) has published guidelines which explain when a representative example must be included when advertising:

“Where the advertisement includes an interest rate or any amount relating to the cost of the credit, then a representative example of the credit on offer must also be included in the advertisement.”

== Information required ==
A representative example must comprise ‘standard information’ and must be accompanied by the words "representative example". It must be representative of agreements to which the representative APR applies and which are expected to result from the advertisement”

The ‘standard information’ which will be included in a representative example includes:

- The rate of interest – a fixed or variable percentage, applied on an annual basis
- Any Total Cost of Credit (TCC) charges - details of any fees or charges included
- Total amount of credit
- Representative APR

Previously, when a company stated an APR figure in an advertisement, this figure was defined as “not be less than the APR paid by at least 66% of consumers on the list”. However, from 1 February 2011, this calculation will change slightly. The BSI reports that: “The representative APR must reflect at least 51% of business expected to result from the advertisement. The standard information must be representative of agreements to which the representative APR applies.”

It is also worth bearing in mind that if there is more than one interest rate applicable – for example for credit cards where there may be a different purchase rate and balance transfer rate – the rate applicable to the most common drawdown mechanism must be shown. Similarly, if a rate applies only for a short period (a 0% balance transfer rate for six months), the duration of the period and the go-to rate, if known should also be shown.

If the advertisement is for running-account credit, the advertiser should assume a credit limit of £1,200 unless it is known that the credit limit will be less than £1,200.

== How it should appear ==
According to the BIS, the representative example “must be clear and concise and presented together”. In addition, the representative example must be the most prominent component of the information.

In simple terms, the representative example:

- Must contain certain standard information including a representative APR
- Must be clear and concise
- Must be more prominent than the information that triggered the inclusion

As the BIS says in its guidelines: “The purpose is to ensure that important information concerning the cost of the credit can be viewed together as a whole, so that the borrower can assess suitability and affordability in the round.”
