= Exponential growth =

Growth of quantities at rate proportional to the current amount

The graph illustrates how exponential growth (green) eventually surpasses both linear (red) and cubic (blue) growth. Linear growth Cubic growth Exponential growth

Exponential growth occurs when a quantity grows as an exponential function of time. The quantity grows at a rate directly proportional to its present size. For example, when it is 3 times as big as it is now, it will be growing 3 times as fast as it is now.

In more technical language, its instantaneous rate of change (that is, the derivative) of a quantity with respect to an independent variable is proportional to the quantity itself. Often the independent variable is time. Described as a function, a quantity undergoing exponential growth is an exponential function of time, that is, the variable representing time is the exponent (in contrast to other types of growth, such as quadratic growth or cubic growth). Exponential growth is the inverse of logarithmic growth.

Terms like "exponential growth" are sometimes incorrectly interpreted as "rapid growth." Indeed, something that grows exponentially can in fact be growing slowly at first. Also, not all cases of growth at an always increasing rate are instances of exponential growth. For example the function $f(x) = x^3$ grows at an ever increasing rate, but is much slower than growing exponentially. For example, when $x=1,$ it grows at 3 times its size, but when $x=10$ it grows at 30% of its size. If an exponentially growing function grows at a rate that is 3 times its present size, then it always grows at a rate that is 3 times its present size: when it is 10 times as big as it is now, it will grow 10 times as fast. On the other hand, functions may also grow faster than exponentially, for instance, the factorial or double exponential function.

If the constant of proportionality is negative, then the quantity decreases over time, and is said to be undergoing exponential decay instead. In the case of a discrete domain of definition with equal intervals, it is also called geometric growth or geometric decay since the function values form a geometric progression.

The formula for exponential growth of a variable x at the growth rate r, as time t goes on in discrete intervals (that is, at integer times 0, 1, 2, 3, ...), is

$$x_t = x_0(1+r)^t$$

where x_{0} is the value of x at time 0. The growth of a bacterial colony is often used to illustrate it. One bacterium splits itself into two, each of which splits itself resulting in four, then eight, 16, 32, and so on. The amount of increase keeps increasing because it is proportional to the ever-increasing number of bacteria. Growth like this is observed in real-life activity or phenomena, such as the spread of virus infection, the growth of debt due to compound interest, and the spread of viral videos. In real cases, initial exponential growth often does not last forever, instead slowing down eventually due to upper limits caused by external factors and turning into logistic growth.

== Examples ==
Bacteria exhibit exponential growth under optimal conditions.

=== Biology ===
- The number of microorganisms in a culture will increase exponentially until an essential nutrient is exhausted, so there is no more of that nutrient for more organisms to grow. Typically the first organism splits into two daughter organisms, who then each split to form four, who split to form eight, and so on. Because exponential growth indicates constant growth rate, it is frequently assumed that exponentially growing cells are at a steady-state. However, cells can grow exponentially at a constant rate while remodeling their metabolism and gene expression.
- A virus (for example COVID-19, or smallpox) typically will spread exponentially at first, if no artificial immunization is available. Each infected person can infect multiple new people.

=== Physical sciences ===
Wind damage in cyclones/hurricanes varies exponentially with wind speed, so that small increases in wind strength can dramatically increase damage.

- Avalanche breakdown within a dielectric material. A free electron becomes sufficiently accelerated by an externally applied electrical field that it frees up additional electrons as it collides with atoms or molecules of the dielectric media. These secondary electrons also are accelerated, creating larger numbers of free electrons. The resulting exponential growth of electrons and ions may rapidly lead to complete dielectric breakdown of the material.
- Nuclear chain reaction (the concept behind nuclear reactors and nuclear weapons). Each uranium nucleus that undergoes fission produces multiple neutrons, each of which can be absorbed by adjacent uranium atoms, causing them to fission in turn. If the probability of neutron absorption exceeds the probability of neutron escape (a function of the shape and mass of the uranium), the production rate of neutrons and induced uranium fissions increases exponentially, in an uncontrolled reaction. "Due to the exponential rate of increase, at any point in the chain reaction 99% of the energy will have been released in the last 4.6 generations. It is a reasonable approximation to think of the first 53 generations as a latency period leading up to the actual explosion, which only takes 3–4 generations."
- Positive feedback within the linear range of electrical or electroacoustic amplification can result in the exponential growth of the amplified signal, although resonance effects may favor some component frequencies of the signal over others. This is the mechanism behing the super-regenerative receiver.

=== Economics ===
- Economic growth is expressed in percentage terms, implying exponential growth.

=== Finance ===
- Compound interest at a constant interest rate provides exponential growth of the capital. See also rule of 72.
- Pyramid schemes or Ponzi schemes also show this type of growth resulting in high profits for a few initial investors and losses among great numbers of investors.

=== Computer science ===
- Processing power of computers. See also Moore's law and technological singularity. (Under exponential growth, there are no singularities. The singularity here is a metaphor, meant to convey an unimaginable future. The link of this hypothetical concept with exponential growth is most vocally made by futurist Ray Kurzweil.)
- In computational complexity theory, computer algorithms of exponential complexity require an exponentially increasing amount of resources (e.g. time, computer memory) for only a constant increase in problem size. So for an algorithm of time complexity 2^{x}, if a problem of size x = 10 requires 10 seconds to complete, and a problem of size x = 11 requires 20 seconds, then a problem of size x = 12 will require 40 seconds. This kind of algorithm typically becomes unusable at very small problem sizes, often between 30 and 100 items (most computer algorithms need to be able to solve much larger problems, up to tens of thousands or even millions of items in reasonable times, something that would be physically impossible with an exponential algorithm). Also, the effects of Moore's Law do not help the situation much because doubling processor speed merely increases the feasible problem size by a constant. E.g. if a slow processor can solve problems of size x in time t, then a processor twice as fast could only solve problems of size x + constant in the same time t. So exponentially complex algorithms are most often impractical, and the search for more efficient algorithms is one of the central goals of computer science today.

=== Internet phenomena ===
- Internet contents, such as internet memes or videos, can spread in an exponential manner, often said to "go viral" as an analogy to the spread of viruses. With media such as social networks, one person can forward the same content to many people simultaneously, who then spread it to even more people, and so on, causing rapid spread. For example, the video Gangnam Style was uploaded to YouTube on 15 July 2012, reaching hundreds of thousands of viewers on the first day, millions on the twentieth day, and was cumulatively viewed by hundreds of millions in less than two months.

== Basic formula ==
Exponential growth: $$\begin{align} a&=3 \\ b&=2 \\ r&=5 \end{align}$$

Exponential decay: $$\begin{align} a&=24 \\ b&=\frac{1}{2} \\ r&=5\end{align}$$

A quantity x depends exponentially on time t if
$$x(t)=a\cdot b^{t/\tau}$$
where the constant a is the initial value of x,
$$x(0) = a \, ,$$
the constant b is a positive growth factor, and τ is the time constant—the time required for x to increase by one factor of b:
$$x(t+\tau) = a \cdot b^{(t+\tau)/\tau} = a \cdot b^{t/\tau} \cdot b^{\tau/\tau} = x(t) \cdot b\, .$$

If τ > 0 and b > 1, then x has exponential growth. If τ < 0 and b > 1, or τ > 0 and 0 < b < 1, then x has exponential decay.

Example: If a species of bacteria doubles every ten minutes, starting out with only one bacterium, how many bacteria would be present after one hour? The question implies a = 1, b = 2 and τ = 10 min.

$$x(t)=a\cdot b^{t/\tau} = 1 \cdot 2^{t/(10\text{ min})}$$
$$x(1\text{ hr}) = 1\cdot 2^{(60\text{ min})/(10\text{ min})} = 1 \cdot 2^6 =64.$$

After one hour, or six ten-minute intervals, there would be sixty-four bacteria.

Many pairs (b, τ) of a dimensionless non-negative number b and an amount of time τ (a physical quantity which can be expressed as the product of a number of units and a unit of time) represent the same growth rate, with τ proportional to log b. For any fixed b not equal to 1 (e.g. e or 2), the growth rate is given by the non-zero time τ. For any non-zero time τ the growth rate is given by the dimensionless positive number b.

Thus the law of exponential growth can be written in different but mathematically equivalent forms, by using a different base. The most common forms are the following:
$$x(t) = x_0\cdot e^{kt} = x_0\cdot e^{t/\tau} = x_0 \cdot 2^{t/T}
= x_0\cdot \left( 1 + \frac{r}{100} \right)^{t/p},$$
where x_{0} expresses the initial quantity x(0).

Parameters (negative in the case of exponential decay):

- The growth constant k is the frequency (number of times per unit time) of growing by a factor e; in finance it is also called the logarithmic return, continuously compounded return, or force of interest.
- The e-folding time τ is the time it takes to grow by a factor e.
- The doubling time T is the time it takes to double.
- The percent increase r (a dimensionless number) in a period p.

The quantities k, τ, and T, and for a given p also r, have a one-to-one connection given by the following equation (which can be derived by taking the natural logarithm of the above):
$$k = \frac{1}{\tau} = \frac{\ln 2}{T} = \frac{\ln \left( 1 + \frac{r}{100} \right)}{p}$$
where k = 0 corresponds to r = 0 and to τ and T being infinite.

If p is the unit of time the quotient t/p is simply the number of units of time. Using the notation t for the (dimensionless) number of units of time rather than the time itself, t/p can be replaced by t, but for uniformity this has been avoided here. In this case the division by p in the last formula is not a numerical division either, but converts a dimensionless number to the correct quantity including unit.

A popular approximated method for calculating the doubling time from the growth rate is the rule of 70, that is, $T \simeq 70 / r$.

Graphs comparing doubling times and half lives of exponential growths (bold lines) and decay (faint lines), and their 70/t and 72/t approximations. In the SVG version, hover over a graph to highlight it and its complement.

== Reformulation as log-linear growth ==
If a variable x exhibits exponential growth according to $x(t) = x_0 (1+r)^t$, then the log (to any base) of x grows linearly over time, as can be seen by taking logarithms of both sides of the exponential growth equation:
$$\log x(t) = \log x_0 + t \cdot \log (1+r).$$

This allows an exponentially growing variable to be modeled with a log-linear model. For example, if one wishes to empirically estimate the growth rate from intertemporal data on x, one can linearly regress log x on t.

== Differential equation ==
The exponential function $x(t) = x_0 e^{kt}$ satisfies the linear differential equation:
$$\frac{dx}{dt} = kx$$
saying that the change per instant of time of x at time t is proportional to the value of x(t), and x(t) has the initial value $x(0) = x_0$.

The differential equation is solved by direct integration:
$$\begin{align}
\frac{dx}{dt} & = kx \\[5pt]
\frac{dx} x & = k\, dt \\[5pt]
\int_{x_0}^{x(t)} \frac{dx}{x} & = k \int_0^t  \, dt \\[5pt]
\ln \frac{x(t)}{x_0} & =  kt.
\end{align}$$
so that
$$x(t) = x_0 e^{kt}.$$

In the above differential equation, if k < 0, then the quantity experiences exponential decay.

For a nonlinear variation of this growth model see logistic function.

== Other growth rates ==
In the long run, exponential growth of any kind will overtake linear growth of any kind (that is the basis of the Malthusian catastrophe) as well as any polynomial growth, that is, for all α:
$$\lim_{t \to \infty} \frac{t^\alpha}{a e^t} = 0.$$

There is a whole hierarchy of conceivable growth rates that are slower than exponential and faster than linear (in the long run). See Degree of a polynomial § Computed from the function values.

Growth rates may also be faster than exponential. In the most extreme case, when growth increases without bound in finite time, it is called hyperbolic growth. In between exponential and hyperbolic growth lie more classes of growth behavior, like the hyperoperations beginning at tetration, and $A(n,n)$, the diagonal of the Ackermann function.

=== Logistic growth ===
The J-shaped exponential growth (left, blue) and the S-shaped logistic growth (right, red)

In reality, initial exponential growth is often not sustained forever. After some period, it will be slowed by external or environmental factors. For example, population growth may reach an upper limit due to resource limitations. In 1845, the Belgian mathematician Pierre François Verhulst first proposed a mathematical model of growth like this, called the "logistic growth".

== Limitations of models ==
Exponential growth models of physical phenomena only apply within limited regions, as unbounded growth is not physically realistic. Although growth may initially be exponential, the modelled phenomena will eventually enter a region in which previously ignored negative feedback factors become significant (leading to a logistic growth model) or other underlying assumptions of the exponential growth model, such as continuity or instantaneous feedback, break down.

== Exponential growth bias ==
Studies show that human beings have difficulty understanding exponential growth. Exponential growth bias is the tendency to underestimate compound growth processes. This bias can have financial implications as well.

=== Rice on a chessboard ===
According to legend, vizier Sissa Ben Dahir presented an Indian King Sharim with a beautiful handmade chessboard. The king asked what he would like in return for his gift and the courtier surprised the king by asking for one grain of rice on the first square, two grains on the second, four grains on the third, and so on. The king readily agreed and asked for the rice to be brought. All went well at first, but the requirement for 2^{n−1} grains on the nth square demanded over a million grains on the 21st square, more than a million million (a.k.a. trillion) on the 41st and there simply was not enough rice in the whole world for the final squares. (From Swirski, 2006)

The "second half of the chessboard" refers to the time when an exponentially growing influence is having a significant economic impact on an organization's overall business strategy.

=== Water lily ===
French children are offered a riddle, which appears to be an aspect of exponential growth: "the apparent suddenness with which an exponentially growing quantity approaches a fixed limit". The riddle imagines a water lily plant growing in a pond. The plant doubles in size every day and, if left alone, it would smother the pond in 30 days killing all the other living things in the water. Day after day, the plant's growth is small, so it is decided that it won't be a concern until it covers half of the pond. Which day will that be? The 29th day, leaving only one day to save the pond.

== See also ==
- Accelerating change
- Albert Allen Bartlett
- Arthrobacter
- Asymptotic notation
- Bacterial growth
- Bounded growth
- Cell growth
- Combinatorial explosion
- Exponential algorithm
- EXPSPACE
- EXPTIME
- Hausdorff dimension
- Hyperbolic growth
- Information explosion
- Law of accelerating returns
- List of exponential topics
- Logarithmic growth
- Logistic function
- Malthusian growth model
- Monotonic function
- Power law
- Menger sponge
- Moore's law
- Quadratic growth
- Stein's law

== Sources ==
- Meadows, Donella. Randers, Jorgen. Meadows, Dennis. The Limits to Growth: The 30-Year Update. Chelsea Green Publishing, 2004. ISBN 9781603581554
- Meadows, Donella H., Dennis L. Meadows, Jørgen Randers, and William W. Behrens III. (1972) The Limits to Growth. New York: University Books. ISBN 0-87663-165-0
- Porritt, J. Capitalism as if the world matters, Earthscan 2005. ISBN 1-84407-192-8
- Swirski, Peter. Of Literature and Knowledge: Explorations in Narrative Thought Experiments, Evolution, and Game Theory. New York: Routledge. ISBN 0-415-42060-1
- Thomson, David G. Blueprint to a Billion: 7 Essentials to Achieve Exponential Growth, Wiley Dec 2005, ISBN 0-471-74747-5
- Tsirel, S. V. 2004. On the Possible Reasons for the Hyperexponential Growth of the Earth Population. Mathematical Modeling of Social and Economic Dynamics / Ed. by M. G. Dmitriev and A. P. Petrov, pp. 367–9. Moscow: Russian State Social University, 2004.
