= Effective interest rate =

Precisely defined interest rate

The effective interest rate (EIR), effective annual interest rate (EAR), annual equivalent rate (AER) or simply effective rate is the percentage of interest on a loan or financial product if compound interest accumulates in periods different than a year. It is the compound interest payable annually in arrears, based on the nominal interest rate. It is used to compare the interest rates between loans with different compounding periods. In a situation where a 10% interest rate is compounded annually, its effective interest rate would also be 10%.

== Calculation ==
The effective annual rate (EAR) expresses the equivalent annual interest if compounding occurs more than once per year. It is given by

$$r = \left(1+\tfrac{i}{n}\right)^n - 1, \qquad
\lim_{n \to \infty} \left(1 + \tfrac{i}{n}\right)^n - 1 = e^i - 1$$

where i is the nominal annual rate and n the number of compounding periods (e.g., 12 for monthly). For example, a nominal rate of 6% compounded monthly gives an EAR of 6.17%, since each month 0.5% is applied and after 12 months the growth factor is $(1+0.005)^{12} \approx 1.0617$. The EAR rises with more frequent compounding.

Effective annual rates at different frequencies of compounding
Nominal annual rate	Frequency of compounding				
Nominal annual rate	Semi-annual	Quarterly	Monthly	Daily	Continuous
1%	1.003%	1.004%	1.005%	1.005%	1.005%
5%	5.063%	5.095%	5.116%	5.127%	5.127%
10%	10.250%	10.381%	10.471%	10.516%	10.517%
15%	15.563%	15.865%	16.075%	16.180%	16.183%
20%	21.000%	21.551%	21.939%	22.134%	22.140%
30%	32.250%	33.547%	34.489%	34.969%	34.986%
40%	44.000%	46.410%	48.213%	49.150%	49.182%
50%	56.250%	60.181%	63.209%	64.816%	64.872%

== Comparison with APR ==
The primary difference between annual percentage rate (APR) and effective interest rate, is that the effective interest rate includes the compounding effect, while APR assumes the payee has paid off all interest on a loan each month. Additionally, the APR method, depending on legal jurisdiction, reflects other factors that may affect the cost of a loan such as including fees that may be charged as a part of a loan. Effective interest is the standard in the European Union and many other countries, while APR is often used in the United States.

== Comparison with APY ==
Annual percentage yield or effective annual yield is the analogous concept for savings or investments, such as a certificate of deposit. Since a loan by a borrower is an investment for the lender, both terms can apply to the same transaction, depending on the point of view. For a zero-coupon bond such as a US treasury bill, an annual effective discount rate may be specified instead of an effective interest rate, because zero coupon bonds trade at a discount from their face values.

== Effective interest rate (accountancy) ==
In accountancy, the term effective interest rate is used to describe the rate used to calculate interest expense or income under the effective interest method. This is not the same as the effective annual rate, and is usually stated as an APR rate.

== See also ==
- Real interest rate
- Real versus nominal value (economics)
- Internal rate of return
