= Annual percentage rate =

Interest rate for a whole year

Parts of total cost and effective APR for a 12-month, 5% monthly interest, $100 loan paid off in equally sized monthly payments.

Annual percentage rate of charge (APR), corresponding sometimes to a nominal APR and sometimes to an effective APR (EAPR), is the interest rate for a whole year (annualized), rather than just a monthly fee/rate, as applied on a loan, mortgage loan, credit card, etc. It is a finance charge expressed as an annual rate. Those terms have formal, legal definitions in some countries or legal jurisdictions, but in the United States:

- The nominal APR is the simple-interest rate (for a year).
- The effective APR is the fee+compound interest rate (calculated across a year).

In some areas, the annual percentage rate (APR) is the simplified counterpart to the effective interest rate that the borrower will pay on a loan. In many countries and jurisdictions, lenders (such as banks) are required to disclose the "cost" of borrowing in some standardized way as a form of consumer protection. The (effective) APR has been intended to make it easier to compare lenders and loan options.

== Multiple definitions of effective APR ==
The nominal APR is calculated by multiplying the interest rate for a payment period by the number of payment periods in a year. However, the exact legal definition of "effective APR", or EAR, can vary greatly in each jurisdiction, depending on the type of fees included, such as participation fees, loan origination fees, monthly service charges, or late fees. The effective APR has been called the "mathematically-true" interest rate for each year.

The computation for the effective APR, as the fee + compound interest rate, can also vary depending on whether the up-front fees, such as origination or participation fees, are added to the entire amount, or treated as a short-term loan due in the first payment. When start-up fees are paid as first payment(s), the balance due might accrue more interest, as being delayed by the extra payment period(s).

Effective annual percentage rate can be computed in at least three ways:

- by compounding the interest rate for each year, without considering fees;
- origination fees are added to the balance due, and the total amount is treated as the basis for computing compound interest;
- the origination fees are amortized as a short-term loan. This loan is due in the first payment(s), and the unpaid balance is amortized as a second long-term loan. The extra first payment(s) is dedicated to primarily paying origination fees and interest charges on that portion.

For example, consider a $100 loan which must be repaid after one month, plus 5%, plus a $10 fee. If the fee is not considered, this loan has an effective APR of approximately 80% (1.05^{12} = 1.7959, which is approximately an 80% increase). If the $10 fee were considered, the monthly interest increases by 10% ($10/$100), and the effective APR becomes approximately 435% (1.15^{12} = 5.3503, which equals a 435% increase). Hence there are at least two possible "effective APRs": 80% and 435%. Laws vary as to whether fees must be included in APR calculations.

=== United States ===
In the United States, the Truth in Lending Act governs the calculation and disclosure of APR, implemented by the Consumer Financial Protection Bureau (CFPB) through Regulation Z. In general, APR in the United States is expressed as the periodic (for instance, monthly) interest rate times the number of compounding periods in a year (also known as the nominal interest rate); since the APR must include certain non-interest charges and fees, it requires more detailed calculation. The APR must be disclosed to the borrower within 3 days of applying for a mortgage. This information is typically mailed to the borrower and the APR is found on the truth in lending disclosure statement, which also includes an amortization schedule.

On July 30, 2009, provisions of the Mortgage Disclosure Improvement Act of 2008 (MDIA) came into effect. A specific clause of this act refers directly to APR disclosure on mortgages. It states, if the final annual percentage rate APR is off by more than 0.125% from the initial GFE disclosure, then the lender must re-disclose and wait another three business days before closing on the transaction.

The calculation for "close-ended credit" (such as a home mortgage or auto loan) can be found here. For a fixed-rate mortgage, the APR is thus equal to its internal rate of return (or yield) under an assumption of zero prepayment and zero default. For an adjustable-rate mortgage the APR will also depend on the particular assumption regarding the prospective trajectory of the index rate.

The calculation for "open-ended credit" (such as a credit card, home equity loan or other line of credit) can be found here.

=== European Union ===
The European Union's APR standardization focuses on transparency and consumer rights: «a comprehensible set of information to be given to consumers in good time before the contract is concluded and also as part of the credit agreement [...] every creditor has to use this form when marketing a consumer credit in any Member State» so marketing different figures is not allowed.

The EU regulations were reinforced with directives 2008/48/EC and 2011/90/EU, fully in force in all member states since 2013. However, in the UK the EU directive has been interpreted as the Representative APR.

A single method of calculating the APR was introduced in 1998 (directive 98/7/EC) and is required to be published for the major part of loans. Using the improved notation of directive 2008/48/EC, the basic equation for calculation of APR in the EU is:

$$\sum_{i=1}^M C_i (1 + \mathrm{APR}/100)^{-t_i} = \sum_{j=1}^N D_j (1 +  \mathrm{APR}/100)^{-s_j}$$

where:

M is the total number of drawdowns paid by the lender
N is the total number of repayments paid by the borrower
i is the sequence number of a drawdown paid by the lender
j is the sequence number of a repayment paid by the borrower
C_{i} is the cash flow amount for drawdown number i
D_{j} is the cash flow amount for repayment number j
t_{i} is the interval, expressed in years and fractions of a year, between the date of the first drawdown* and the date of drawdown i
s_{j} is the interval, expressed in years and fractions of a year, between the date of the first drawdown* and the date of repayment j.

- The EU formula uses the natural convention that all time intervals in t_{i} and s_{j} are measured relative to the date of the first drawdown, hence t_{1} = 0. However, any other date could be used without affecting the calculated APR, as long as it is used consistently: an offset applied to all times simply scales both sides of the equation by the same amount, without affecting the solution for APR.

In this equation the left side is the present value of the drawdowns made by the lender and the right side is the present value of the repayments made by the borrower. In both cases the present value is defined given the APR as the interest rate. So the present value of the drawdowns is equal to the present value of the repayments, given the APR as the interest rate.

Note that neither the amounts nor the periods between transactions are necessarily equal. For the purposes of this calculation, a year is presumed to have 365 days (366 days for leap years), 52 weeks or 12 equal months. As per the standard: "An equal month is presumed to have 30.41666 days (i.e. 365/12) regardless of whether or not it is a leap year." The result is to be expressed to at least one decimal place. This algorithm for APR is required for some but not all forms of consumer debt in the EU. For example, this EU directive is limited to agreements of €50,000 and below and excludes all mortgages.

In the Netherlands the formula above is also used for mortgages. In many cases the mortgage is not always paid back completely at the end of period N, but for instance when the borrower sells his house or dies. In addition, there is usually only one payment of the lender to the borrower: in the beginning of the loan. In that case the formula becomes:

$$S -A = R (1 +  \mathrm{APR}/100)^{-t_N} + \sum_{k=1}^N A_k (1 +  \mathrm{APR}/100)^{-t_k}$$

where:

S is the borrowed amount or principal amount.
A is the prepaid onetime fee
R the rest debt, the amount that remains as an interest-only loan after the last cash flow.

If the length of the periods are equal (monthly payments) then the summations can be simplified using the formula for a geometric series. Either way, the APR can be solved iteratively only from the formulas above, apart from trivial cases such as N=1.

=== Additional considerations ===
- Confusion is possible in that if the word "effective" is used separately as meaning "influential" or having a "long-range effect", then the term effective APR will vary, as it is not a strict legal definition in some countries. The APR is used to find compound and simple interest rates.
- APR is also an abbreviation for "Annual Principal Rate" which is sometimes used in the auto sales in some countries where the interest is calculated based on the "Original Principal" not the "Current Principal Due", so as the Current Principal Due decreases, the interest due does not.

== Rate format ==
An effective annual interest rate of 10% can also be expressed in several ways:

- 0.7974% effective monthly interest rate, because 1.007974^{12}=1.1
- 9.569% annual interest rate compounded monthly, because 12×0.7974=9.569
- 9.091% annual rate in advance, because (1.1-1)÷1.1=0.09091

These rates are all equivalent, but to a consumer who is not trained in the mathematics of finance, this can be confusing. APR helps to standardize how interest rates are compared, so that a 10% loan is not made to look cheaper by calling it a loan at "9.1% annually in advance".

The APR does not necessarily convey the total amount of interest paid over the course of a year: if one pays part of the interest prior to the end of the year, the total amount of interest paid is less.

In the case of a loan with no fees, the amortization schedule would be worked out by taking the principal left at the end of each month, multiplying by the monthly rate and then subtracting the monthly payment.

This can be expressed mathematically by

$$p = \frac{P_0\cdot r\cdot (1+r)^n}{(1+r)^n-1}$$
where:

p is the payment made each period
P_{0} is the initial principal
r is the percentage rate used each payment
n is the number of payments

This also explains why a 15-year mortgage and a 30-year mortgage with the same APR would have different monthly payments and a different total amount of interest paid. There are many more periods over which to spread the principal, which makes the payment smaller, but there are just as many periods over which to charge interest at the same rate, which makes the total amount of interest paid much greater. For example, $100,000 mortgaged (without fees, since they add into the calculation in a different way) over 15 years costs a total of $193,429.80 (interest is 93.430% of principal), but over 30 years, costs a total of $315,925.20 (interest is 215.925% of principal).

In addition the APR takes costs into account. Suppose for instance that $100,000 is borrowed with $1000 one-time fees paid in advance. If, in the second case, equal monthly payments are made of $946.01 against 9.569% compounded monthly then it takes 240 months to pay the loan back. If the $1000 one-time fees are taken into account then the yearly interest rate paid is effectively equal to 10.31%.

The APR concept can also be applied to savings accounts: imagine a savings account with 1% costs at each withdrawal and again 9.569% interest compounded monthly. Suppose that the complete amount including the interest is withdrawn after exactly one year. Then, taking this 1% fee into account, the savings effectively earned 8.9% interest that year.

=== Money factor ===
The APR can also be represented by a money factor (also known as the lease factor, lease rate, or factor). The money factor is usually given as a decimal, for example .0030. To find the equivalent APR, the money factor is multiplied by 2400. A money factor of .0030 is equivalent to a monthly interest rate of 0.6% and an APR of 7.2%.

For a leasing arrangement with an initial capital cost of C, a residual value at the end of the lease of F and a monthly interest rate of r, monthly interest starts at Cr and decreases almost linearly during the term of the lease to a final value of Fr. The total amount of interest paid over the lease term of N months is therefore

$$\frac{N(Cr+Fr)}{2}\, ,$$

and the average interest amount per month is

$$\frac{(C+F)r}{2}\, .$$

This amount is called the "monthly finance fee". The factor r/2 is called the "money factor"

== Failings in the United States ==
Despite repeated attempts by regulators to establish usable and consistent standards, APR does not represent the total cost of borrowing in some jurisdictions nor does it really create a comparable standard across jurisdictions. Nevertheless, it is considered a reasonable starting point for an ad hoc comparison of lenders.

=== Nominal APR does not reflect the true cost ===
Credit card holders should be aware that most U.S. credit cards are quoted in terms of nominal APR compounded monthly, which is not the same as the effective annual rate (EAR). Despite the word "annual" in APR, it is not necessarily a direct reference for the interest rate paid on a stable balance over one year. The more direct reference for the one-year rate of interest is EAR. The general conversion factor for APR to EAR is $\mathrm{EAR} = (1 + \tfrac{\mathrm{APR}}{n})^n - 1$, where n represents the number of compounding periods of the APR per EAR period. As an example, for a common credit card quoted at 12.99% APR compounded monthly, the one year EAR is $(1+\tfrac{0.129949}{12})^{12} - 1$, or 13.7975%. For 12.99% APR compounded daily, the EAR paid on a stable balance over one year becomes 13.87% (where the .000049 addition to the 12.99% APR is possible because the new rate does not exceed the advertised APR). Note that a high U.S. APR of 29.99% compounded monthly carries an effective annual rate of 34.48%.

While the difference between APR and EAR may seem trivial, because of the exponential nature of interest these small differences can have a large effect over the life of a loan. For example, consider a 30-year loan of $200,000 with a stated APR of 10.00%, i.e., 10.0049% APR or the EAR equivalent of 10.4767%. The monthly payments, using APR, would be $1755.87. However, using an EAR of 10.00% the monthly payment would be $1691.78. The difference between the EAR and APR amounts to a difference of $64.09 per month. Over the life of a 30-year loan, this amounts to $23,070.86, which is over 11% of the original loan amount.

=== Certain fees are not considered ===
Some classes of fees are deliberately not included in the calculation of APR. Because these fees are not included, some consumer advocates claim that the APR does not represent the total cost of borrowing. Excluded fees may include:

- routine one-time fees which are paid to someone other than the lender (such as a real estate attorney's fee).
- penalties such as late fees or service reinstatement fees without regard for the size of the penalty or the likelihood that it will be imposed.

Lenders argue that the real estate attorney's fee, for example, is a pass-through cost, not a cost of the lending. In effect, they are arguing that the attorney's fee is a separate transaction and not a part of the loan. Consumer advocates argue that this would be true if the customer is free to select which attorney is used. If the lender insists, however, on using a specific attorney, the cost should be looked at as a component of the total cost of doing business with that lender. This area is made more complicated by the practice of contingency fees – for example, when the lender receives money from the attorney and other agents to be the one used by the lender. Because of this, U.S. regulators require all lenders to produce an affiliated business disclosure form which shows the amounts paid between the lender and the appraisal firms, attorneys, etc.

Lenders argue that including late fees and other conditional charges would require them to make assumptions about the consumer's behavior – assumptions which would bias the resulting calculation and create more confusion than clarity.

=== Not a comparable standard ===
Even beyond the non-included cost components listed above, regulators have been unable to completely define which one-time fees must be included and which excluded from the calculation. This leaves the lender with some discretion to determine which fees will be included (or not) in the calculation.

Consumers can, of course, use the nominal interest rate and any costs on the loan (or savings account) and compute the APR themselves, for instance using one of the calculators on the internet.

In the example of a mortgage loan, the following kinds of fees are:

Generally included	Sometimes included	Generally not included
Points; Pre-paid interest; Origination fees including loan processing, underwriting and document preparation; Attorney and notary fees; Closing agent's document preparation fees; Private mortgage insurance (PMI)	Application fees; Life insurance	Appraisal; Home-inspection; Credit report costs; Title fee

The discretion that is illustrated in the "sometimes included" column even in the highly regulated U.S. home mortgage environment makes it difficult to simply compare the APRs of two lenders. Note: U.S. regulators generally require a lender to use the same assumptions and definitions in their calculation of APR for each of their products even though they cannot force consistency across lenders.

With respect to items that may be sold with vendor financing, for example, automobile leasing, the notional cost of the good may effectively be hidden and the APR subsequently rendered meaningless. An example is a case where an automobile is leased to a customer based on a "manufacturer's suggested retail price" with a low APR: the vendor may be accepting a lower lease rate as a trade-off against a higher sale price. Had the customer self-financed, a discounted sales price may have been accepted by the vendor; in other words, the customer has received cheap financing in exchange for paying a higher purchase price, and the quoted APR understates the true cost of the financing. In this case, the only meaningful way to establish the "true" APR would involve arranging financing through other sources, determining the lowest-acceptable cash price and comparing the financing terms (which may not be feasible in all circumstances). For leases where the lessee has a purchase option at the end of the lease term, the cost of the APR is further complicated by this option. In effect, the lease includes a put option back to the manufacturer (or, alternatively, a call option for the consumer), and the value (or cost) of this option to the consumer is not transparent.

=== Dependence on loan period ===
APR is dependent on the time period for which the loan is calculated. That is, the APR for a 30-year loan cannot be compared to the APR for a 20-year loan. APR can be used to show the relative impact of different payment schedules (such as balloon payments or biweekly payments instead of straight monthly payments), but most standard APR calculators have difficulty with those calculations.

Furthermore, most APR calculators assume that an individual will keep a particular loan until the end of the defined repayment period, resulting in the up-front fixed closing costs being amortized over the full term of the loan. If the consumer pays the loan off early, the effective interest rate achieved will be significantly higher than the APR initially calculated. This is especially problematic for mortgage loans, where typical loan repayment periods are 15 or 30 years but where many borrowers move or refinance before the loan period runs out, which increases the borrower's effective cost for any points or other origination fees.

In theory, this factor should not affect any individual consumer's ability to compare the APR of the same product (same repayment period and origination fees) across vendors. APR may not, however, be particularly helpful when attempting to compare different products, or similar products with different terms.

==== Interest-only loans ====
Since the principal loan balance is not paid down during the interest-only term, assuming there are no set up costs, the APR will be the same as the interest rate.

Three lenders with identical information may still calculate different APRs. The calculations can be quite complex and are poorly understood even by most financial professionals. Most users depend on software packages to calculate APR and are therefore dependent on the assumptions in that particular software package. While differences between software packages will not result in large variations, there are several acceptable methods of calculating APR, each of which returns a slightly different result.

== Limitations ==
Despite its usefulness in comparing borrowing costs across different loans and credit offers, APR has several limitations that can affect its accuracy and relevance, particularly for certain types of loans.

=== Potential misrepresentation of short-term loan costs ===
There are instances where APR may be misleading or an inaccurate measure of borrowing costs. It is argued that the APR can be misleading when applied to small-dollar loans, such as payday loans, because it does not accurately represent the true cost of borrowing for short-term financial products. While effective for comparing costs of longer-term loans, APR exaggerates the expense associated with short-term, small-dollar loans, thus potentially misleading consumers about the actual costs they will incur.

In a paper by Thomas W. Miller Jr. at the Mercatus Center, it is argued that while interest rate caps are often proposed as a means to combat "predatory" lending practices associated with high APRs on small-dollar loans, such regulatory measures overlook potential adverse effects. The analysis suggests that a 36 percent interest rate cap could lead to a scarcity of available loans, as the caps may cause demand to surpass supply and prompt lenders to redirect capital away from small-dollar lending markets. This shift could effectively result in an implicit prohibition of products like payday loans by rendering them financially unsustainable.

=== Inaccuracy in mortgage comparisons ===
APR may not accurately reflect the cost of borrowing for certain mortgage types, such as those with non-standard repayment structures. APR calculations, which aim to provide a comprehensive cost measure by including interest rates and other fees, might not capture the complexities or the true costs of mortgages that deviate from traditional, fixed-rate, amortizing loans. This discrepancy arises because APR is designed under the assumption of a standard loan structure, potentially misleading consumers about the financial implications of mortgages with variable rates, interest-only periods, or other unique features.

=== Exclusion of junk fees ===
APR does not encompass all fees associated with a loan, particularly "junk fees". These excluded fees can include various types of non-interest charges such as certain closing costs, which are not reflected in the APR calculation. This exclusion can mislead consumers about the true cost of borrowing, as the APR presents a narrower scope of expenses than what the borrower may eventually pay.

== See also ==
- Compound interest
