= Bullet loan =

Type of financial instrument

In banking and finance, a bullet loan is a loan where a payment of the entire principal of the loan, and sometimes the principal and interest, is due at the end of the loan term. Likewise for bullet bond. A bullet loan can be a mortgage, bond, note or any other type of credit.

In a bullet loan, one can choose to pay only the interest amount, and the bulk amount can be paid later at the time of the maturity of the loan or as agreed by the financial institution. This arrangement is convenient to individuals who are expecting a huge cash flow in the form of bonuses or fixed returns in some months. It lowers the borrower's monthly financial burden. It is also sometimes known as EMI Free Loan.

The payment that is due at the end of the loan is referred to as the bullet payment or balloon payment.

Bullet loans are common, and usually referred to by other names; bullet loan is a generic and unofficial term. Many types of publicly traded bonds and notes constitute bullet loans: the face value of the bond is payable at bond maturity, and only interest payments are due during the interim periods. Short-term bonds or notes that pay no interest are also a form of bullet loan.

Bullet loans should be contrasted with amortizing loans, where the amount of principal is paid down over the life of the loan. There is no requirement that a loan be either a bullet loan or an amortizing loan; combinations of all sorts exist. For example, a loan may have a grace period during which no principal is paid; partial amortization during the remainder of the loan; and a bullet payment at the end of the loan that is some percentage of the original principal.

In China, certain types of bullet loans have been prohibited by the China Banking Regulatory Commission due to concerns regarding Chinese banks' risk management capabilities. This extends only to lending to retail, commercial, and government clients, while not including the issuance of bonds or notes.

== See also ==
- Balloon payment mortgage
