= Equated monthly installment =

Loan repayment variant

An equated monthly installment (EMI) is a fixed payment amount made by a borrower to a lender at a specified date each calendar month. Equated monthly installments are used to pay off both interest and principal each month, so that over a specified number of years, the loan is fully paid off along with interest.

As with most common types of loans, such as real estate mortgages, the borrower makes fixed periodic payments to the lender over the course of several years with the goal of retiring the loan. EMIs differ from variable payment plans, in which the borrower is able to pay higher payment amounts at his or her discretion. In EMI plans, borrowers are mostly only allowed one fixed payment amount each month.

== Formula ==
The formula for EMI (in arrears) is:

$$P \,=\,A\cdot\frac{1-\left({1+r}\right)^{-n} }{r}$$

or, equivalently,

$$A \,=\,P\cdot\frac{r(1 + r)^n}{(1 + r)^n - 1}$$

Where: P is the principal amount borrowed, A is the periodic amortization payment, r is the annual interest rate divided by 100 (annual interest rate also divided by 12 in case of monthly installments), and n is the total number of payments (for a 30-year loan with monthly payments n = 30 × 12 = 360).

For example, if you borrow $10,000,000 from the bank at 10.5% annual interest for a period of 10 years (i.e., 120 months), then EMI = $10,000,000 × 0.00875 × (1 + 0.00875)^{120}/((1 + 0.00875)^{120} – 1) = $134,935. i.e., you will have to pay $134,935 for 120 months to repay the entire loan amount. The total amount payable will be $134,935 × 120 = $16,192,200 that includes $6,192,200 as interest toward the loan.

== Amortization ==
Equated monthly installments are a form of amortizing repayment, meaning that each periodic payment includes both interest and principal. Consumer Financial Protection Bureau guidance explains that in an amortizing loan, a fixed monthly payment is made over time, with a larger share going toward interest at the beginning of the loan and a larger share going toward principal later in the repayment period.

In Indian banking usage, “EMI” is the standard term for such periodic repayments. Reserve Bank of India consumer education materials define EMI as loan repayment in equal monthly installments.
