= Nominal interest rate =

Interest rate without adjusting for inflation

In finance and economics, the nominal interest rate or nominal rate of interest is the rate of interest stated on a loan or investment, without any adjustments for inflation.

== Examples of adjustments or fees ==
1. An adjustment for inflation (in contrast with the real interest rate).
2. Compound interest (also referred to as the nominal annual rate).

== Nominal versus real interest rate ==
The concept of real interest rate is useful to account for the impact of inflation. In the case of a loan, it is this real interest that the lender effectively receives. For example, if the lender is receiving 8 percent from a loan and the inflation rate is also 8 percent, then the (effective) real rate of interest is zero: despite the increased nominal amount of currency received, the lender would have no monetary value benefit from such a loan because each unit of currency would be devalued due to inflation by the same factor as the nominal amount gets increased.

The relationship between the real interest value $r$, the nominal interest rate value $R$, and the inflation rate value $i$ is given by

$$(1+r)=(1+R)/(1+i)$$

or

$$r=(R-i)/(1+i)$$

When the inflation rate $i$ is low, the real interest rate is approximately given by the nominal interest rate minus the inflation rate, i.e.,

$$r \approx R - i \,$$

In this analysis, the nominal rate is the stated rate, and the real interest rate is the interest after the expected losses due to inflation. Since the future inflation rate can only be estimated, the ex ante and ex post (before and after the fact) real interest rates may be different; the premium paid to actual inflation (higher or lower).

== Nominal versus effective interest rate ==
The nominal interest rate, also known as an annual percentage rate or APR, is the periodic interest rate multiplied by the number of periods per year. For example, a nominal annual interest rate of 12% based on monthly compounding means a 1% interest rate per month (compounded). A nominal interest rate for compounding periods less than a year is always lower than the equivalent rate with annual compounding (this immediately follows from elementary algebraic manipulations of the formula for compound interest). Note that a nominal rate without the compounding frequency is not fully defined: for any interest rate, the effective interest rate cannot be specified without knowing the compounding frequency and the rate. Although some conventions are used where the compounding frequency is understood, consumers in particular may fail to understand the importance of knowing the effective rate.

Nominal interest rates are not comparable unless their compounding periods are the same; effective interest rates correct for this by "converting" nominal rates into annual compound interest. In many cases, depending on local regulations, interest rates as quoted by lenders and in advertisements are based on nominal, not effective interest rates, and hence may understate the interest rate compared to the equivalent effective annual rate.

Confusingly, in the context of inflation, 'nominal' has a different meaning. A nominal rate can mean a rate before adjusting for inflation, and a real rate is a constant-prices rate. The Fisher equation is used to convert between real and nominal rates. To avoid confusion about the term nominal which has these different meanings, some finance textbooks use the term 'Annualised Percentage Rate' or APR rather than 'nominal rate' when they are discussing the difference between effective rates and APR's.

The term should not be confused with simple interest (as opposed to compound interest) which is not compounded.

The effective interest rate is always calculated as if compounded annually. The effective rate is calculated in the following way, where r is the effective rate, i the nominal rate (as a decimal, e.g. 12% = 0.12), and n the number of compounding periods per year (for example, 12 for monthly compounding):

$$r \ = \ (1+i/n)^n - 1$$

== Examples ==
=== Monthly compounding ===
Example 1: A nominal interest rate of 6% compounded monthly is equivalent to an effective interest rate of 6.17%.

Example 2: 6% annually is credited as 6%/12 = 0.5% every month. After one year, the initial capital is increased by the factor (1+0.005)^{12} ≈ 1.0617.

=== Daily compounding ===
A loan with daily compounding has a substantially higher rate in effective annual terms. For a loan with a 10% nominal annual rate and daily compounding, the effective annual rate is 10.516%. For a loan of $10,000 (paid at the end of the year in a single lump sum), the borrower would pay $51.56 more than one who was charged 10% interest, compounded annually.
