= Annual effective discount rate =

Interest as % of final balance

The annual effective discount rate expresses the amount of interest paid or earned as a percentage of the balance at the end of the annual period. It is related to but slightly smaller than the effective rate of interest, which expresses the amount of interest as a percentage of the balance at the start of the period. The discount rate is commonly used for U.S. Treasury bills and similar financial instruments.

For example, consider a government bond that sells for $95 ('balance' in the bond at the start of period) and pays $100 ('balance' in the bond at the end of period) in a year's time. The discount rate is

$$\frac{100-95}{100} = 5.00\%$$

The effective interest rate is calculated using 95 as the base

$$\frac{100-95}{95} = 5.26\%$$

which says that $95\%$ of $105.26 is $100.

For every effective interest rate $i$, there is a corresponding effective discount rate $d$ that can produce the same future value as $i$ if a given amount of principal is invested for the same amount of time at each of the rates $i$ and $d$, and they are said to be equivalent. Therefore, we have the following relationship between two equivalent rates $i$ and $d$.

$$1+i=\frac{1}{1-d}.$$

Using this, we can derive the following expression of $d$ and $i$.

$d = \frac{i}{1+i}$, and

$$i = \frac{d}{1-d}.$$

We usually define $v$ as the discount factor which is given by

$v = \frac{1}{1+i}$, then we can derive that

$v = 1-d$, and

$$d = iv$$

using the above relationships between $i$ and $d$.

== Annual discount rate convertible pthly ==
A discount rate applied $\,p$ times over equal subintervals of a year is found from the annual effective rate d as

$$1-d = \left(1-\frac{d^{(p)}}{p}\right)^p$$

where $\,d^{(p)}$ is called the annual nominal rate of discount convertible $\,p$thly.

$$1-d = \exp (-d^{(\infty)})$$

$\,d^{(\infty)}=\delta$ is the force of interest.

The rate $\,d^{(p)}$ is always bigger than d because the rate of discount convertible $\,p$thly is applied in each subinterval to a smaller (already discounted) sum of money. As such, in order to achieve the same total amount of discounting the rate has to be slightly more than 1/pth of the annual rate of discount.

== Business calculations ==
Businesses consider this discount rate when deciding whether to invest profits to buy equipment or whether to deliver the profit to shareholders. In an ideal world, they would buy a piece of equipment if shareholders would get a bigger profit later. The amount of extra profit a shareholder requires to prefer that the company buy the equipment rather than giving them the profit now is based on the shareholder's discount rate. A common way of estimating shareholders' discount rates uses share price data is known as the capital asset pricing model. Businesses normally apply this discount rate by calculating the net present value of the decision.

== See also ==
- Notation of interest rates
