= Amortization schedule =

Table detailing each periodic payment on an amortizing loan

An amortization schedule is a table detailing each periodic payment on an amortizing loan (typically a mortgage), as generated by an amortization calculator. Amortization refers to the process of paying off a debt (often from a loan or mortgage) over time through regular payments. A portion of each payment is for interest while the remaining amount is applied towards the principal balance. The percentage of interest versus principal in each payment is determined in an amortization schedule. The schedule differentiates the portion of payment that belongs to interest expense from the portion used to close the gap of a discount or premium from the principal after each payment.

While a portion of every payment is applied towards both the interest and the principal balance of the loan, the exact amount applied to principal each time varies (with the remainder going to interest). An amortization schedule indicates the specific monetary amount put towards interest, as well as the specific amount put towards the principal balance, with each payment. Initially, a large portion of each payment is devoted to interest. As the loan matures, larger portions go towards paying down the principal.

== Methods of amortization ==
There are different methods used to develop an amortization schedule. These include:

- Straight line (linear)
- Declining balance
- Annuity
- Bullet (all at once)
- Balloon (amortization payments and large end payment)
- Increasing balance (negative amortization)

Amortization schedules run in chronological order. The first payment is assumed to take place one full payment period after the loan was taken out, not on the first day (the origination date) of the loan. The last payment completely pays off the remainder of the loan. Often, the last payment will be a slightly different amount than all earlier payments.

In addition to breaking down each payment into interest and principal portions, an amortization schedule also indicates interest paid to date, principal paid to date, and the remaining principal balance on each payment date.

== Amortization schedule assumptions ==
This amortization schedule is based on the following assumptions:

First, it should be known that rounding errors occur and, depending on how the lender accumulates these errors, the blended payment (principal plus interest) may vary slightly some months to keep these errors from accumulating; or, the accumulated errors are adjusted for at the end of each year or at the final loan payment.

There are a few crucial points worth noting when mortgaging a home with an amortized loan. First, there is substantial disparate allocation of the monthly payments toward the interest, especially during the first 18 years of a 30-year mortgage. In the example below, payment 1 allocates about 80-90% of the total payment towards interest and only 10-20% toward the principal balance. The exact percentage allocated towards payment of the principal depends on the interest rate. Not until payment 257 or over two thirds through the term does the payment allocation towards principal and interest even out and subsequently tip the majority toward the former.

For a fully amortizing loan, with a fixed (i.e., non-variable) interest rate, the payment remains the same throughout the term, regardless of principal balance owed. For example, the payment on the above scenario will remain $733.76 regardless of whether the outstanding (unpaid) principal balance is $100,000 or $50,000. Paying down more than the monthly contractual amount reduces the amount outstanding and thus the interest that is payable to the lender; if the contractual monthly payment stays the same, the number of payments and the term of the loan must decrease. Conversely, paying down less than the monthly contractual amount increases the amount outstanding and thus the interest payable (negative amortization); if the contractual monthly payment stays the same, the number of payments and the term of the loan must increase.
