= Effective interest method =

Accounting technique

The effective interest method, also known as effective interest rate method, present value amortization, or simply as interest method, is an accounting technique used to amortize bond premiums and discounts over the life of a bond, reflecting the actual cost of borrowing or return on an investment. It involves calculating periodic interest expense by multiplying the bond's carrying amount (book value) by the bond's effective interest rate. The difference between this calculated interest expense and the cash interest payment determines the amortization of the premium or discount, which adjusts the bond's carrying value over time.

This method is used as an alternative to the straight-line method of amortization.

== Usage ==
The International Financial Reporting Standards (IFRS) requires that the discount and premium on bonds payable be amortized using the effective interest method. This method distinguishes between the nominal rate, which is the stated rate, and the effective rate, which is the market rate. The effective rate discounts future cash payments to the net carrying amount of the bonds. When bonds are sold at face value, both rates are the same. If sold at a premium, the effective rate is lower; if sold at a discount, it is higher.

For non-prepayable loans, receivables, and debt securities, the method is used throughout the asset's life for recognizing accretion and amortization.

The effective interest method calculates interest expense by multiplying the effective rate by the carrying amount of bonds payable, which changes yearly due to amortization. The effective interest is compared to the nominal interest to find the premium or discount amortization. It provides a more accurate measure of interest expense compared to the straight-line method. Although both methods yield the same total interest expense, significant differences in annual amounts require the use of the effective interest method. The United States' Generally Accepted Accounting Principles (GAAP) preferred the use of the effective interest method but permits the use of the straight-line method if it is not materially different.

=== Bond issue cost ===
The IFRS states that transaction costs directly linked to issuing a financial liability should be included in its initial measurement. Transaction costs cover fees to agents, advisers, and brokers, as well as regulatory levies and transfer taxes. The effective interest rate calculation must factor in all transaction costs, premiums, and discounts. Bond issue costs raise the discount on bonds payable and lower the premium. They should be combined with the discount and offset against the premium under the effective interest method.
