= Principal balance =

Amount due and owed to satisfy the payoff of an underlying debt

The principal balance, in regard to a mortgage, loan, or other debt financial contractual agreements, is the amount due and owed to satisfy the payoff of an underlying obligation. It is distinct from, and does not include, interest or other charges.

Amortized mortgage loans automatically pay a portion of each monthly payment to the principal balance, with the rest being paid as interest.

An interest-only loan doesn't require any money to be paid toward the principal balance each month, but such payment is allowable.

== Payoff amount ==
The principal balance is different from the payoff amount. In a mortgage loan, the payoff amount is the amount required to satisfy the loan terms and fully pay off the debt. It may differ from the current principal balance because it can include interest owed through the payoff date, unpaid fees, or other charges required to close the loan account.

Monthly mortgage statements may also separate the current payment into amounts applied to principal, interest, escrow, and fees. This distinction helps borrowers identify how much of a payment reduces the principal balance and how much is applied to other loan-related obligations.

== See also ==
- Unpaid principal balance
