= Natural logarithm of 2 =

Mathematical constant

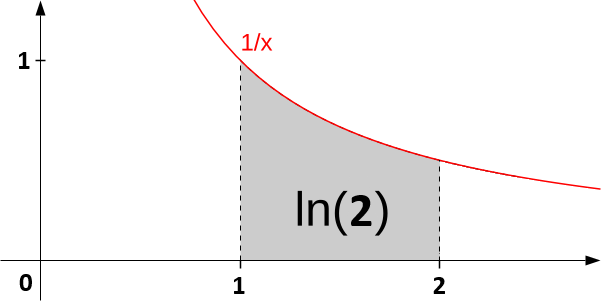
- The natural logarithm of 2 as an area under the curve 1/x.
- Rationality: Transcendental

Representations
- Decimal: 0.6931471805599453094...

In mathematics, the natural logarithm of 2 is the unique real number argument such that the exponential function equals two. It appears frequently in various formulas and is also given by the alternating harmonic series. The decimal value of the natural logarithm of 2 (sequence A002162 in the OEIS) truncated at 30 decimal places is given by:

$$\ln 2 \approx 0.693\,147\,180\,559\,945\,309\,417\,232\,121\,458.$$

The logarithm of 2 in other bases is obtained with the formula

$$\log_b 2 = \frac{\ln 2}{\ln b}.$$

The common logarithm in particular is ( OEIS: A007524)

$$\log_{10} 2 \approx 0.301\,029\,995\,663\,981\,195.$$

The inverse of this number is the binary logarithm of 10:

$\log_2 10 =\frac{1}{\log_{10} 2} \approx 3.321\,928\,095$ (

OEIS: A020862).

By the Lindemann–Weierstrass theorem, the natural logarithm of any natural number other than 0 and 1 (more generally, of any positive algebraic number other than 1) is a transcendental number. It is also contained in the ring of algebraic periods.

== Series representations ==
=== Rising alternate factorial ===
$\ln 2 = \sum_{n=1}^\infty \frac{(-1)^{n+1}}{n}=1-\frac12+\frac13-\frac14+\frac15-\frac16+\cdots.$ This is the well-known "alternating harmonic series".
$$\ln 2 = \frac{1}{2} +\frac{1}{2}\sum_{n=1}^\infty \frac{(-1)^{n+1}}{n(n+1)}.$$
$$\ln 2 = \frac{5}{8} +\frac{1}{2}\sum_{n=1}^\infty \frac{(-1)^{n+1}}{n(n+1)(n+2)}.$$
$$\ln 2 = \frac{2}{3} +\frac{3}{4}\sum_{n=1}^\infty \frac{(-1)^{n+1}}{n(n+1)(n+2)(n+3)}.$$
$$\ln 2 = \frac{131}{192} +\frac{3}{2}\sum_{n=1}^\infty \frac{(-1)^{n+1}}{n(n+1)(n+2)(n+3)(n+4)}.$$
$$\ln 2 = \frac{661}{960} +\frac{15}{4}\sum_{n=1}^\infty \frac{(-1)^{n+1}}{n(n+1)(n+2)(n+3)(n+4)(n+5)}.$$
$$\ln 2 = \frac{2}{3}\left(1+\frac{2}{4^3-4}+\frac{2}{8^3-8}+\frac{2}{12^3-12}+\dots\right) .$$

=== Binary rising constant factorial ===
$$\ln 2 = \sum_{n=1}^\infty \frac{1}{2^{n}n}.$$
$$\ln 2 = 1 -\sum_{n=1}^\infty \frac{1}{2^{n}n(n+1)}.$$
$$\ln 2 = \frac{1}{2} + 2 \sum_{n=1}^\infty \frac{1}{2^{n}n(n+1)(n+2)} .$$
$$\ln 2 = \frac{5}{6} - 6 \sum_{n=1}^\infty \frac{1}{2^{n}n(n+1)(n+2)(n+3)} .$$
$$\ln 2 = \frac{7}{12} + 24 \sum_{n=1}^\infty \frac{1}{2^{n}n(n+1)(n+2)(n+3)(n+4)} .$$
$$\ln 2 = \frac{47}{60} - 120 \sum_{n=1}^\infty \frac{1}{2^{n}n(n+1)(n+2)(n+3)(n+4)(n+5)} .$$

=== Other series representations ===
$$\sum_{n=0}^\infty \frac{1}{(2n+1)(2n+2)} = \ln 2.$$
$$\sum_{n=1}^\infty \frac{1}{n(4n^2-1)} = 2\ln 2 -1.$$
$$\sum_{n=1}^\infty \frac{(-1)^n}{n(4n^2-1)} = \ln 2 -1.$$
$$\sum_{n=1}^\infty \frac{(-1)^n}{n(9n^2-1)} = 2\ln 2 -\frac{3}{2}.$$
$$\sum_{n=1}^\infty \frac{1}{4n^2-2n} = \ln 2.$$
$$\sum_{n=1}^\infty \frac{2(-1)^{n+1}(2n-1)+1}{8n^2-4n} = \ln 2.$$
$$\sum_{n=0}^\infty \frac{(-1)^{n}}{3n+1} = \frac{\ln 2}{3}+\frac{\pi}{3\sqrt{3}}.$$
$$\sum_{n=0}^\infty \frac{(-1)^{n}}{3n+2} = -\frac{\ln 2}{3}+\frac{\pi}{3\sqrt{3}}.$$
$$\sum_{n=0}^\infty \frac{(-1)^{n}}{(3n+1)(3n+2)} = \frac{2\ln 2}{3}.$$
$\sum_{n=1}^\infty \frac{1}{\sum_{k=1}^n k^2} = 18 - 24 \ln 2$ using $\lim_{N\rightarrow \infty} \sum_{n=N}^{2N} \frac{1}{n} = \ln 2$
$\sum_{n=1}^\infty \frac{1}{4n^2-3n} = \ln 2 + \frac{\pi}{6}$ (sums of the reciprocals of decagonal numbers)

=== Involving the Riemann Zeta function ===
$$\sum_{n=1}^\infty \frac{1}{n}[\zeta(2n)-1] = \ln 2.$$
$$\sum_{n=2}^\infty \frac{1}{2^n}[\zeta(n)-1] = \ln 2 -\frac{1}{2}.$$
$$\sum_{n=1}^\infty \frac{1}{2n+1}[\zeta(2n+1)-1] = 1-\gamma-\frac{\ln 2}{2}.$$
$$\sum_{n=1}^\infty \frac{1}{2^{2n-1}(2n+1)}\zeta(2n) = 1-\ln 2.$$

(γ is the Euler–Mascheroni constant and ζ Riemann's zeta function.)

=== BBP-type representations ===
$$\ln 2 = \frac{2}{3} + \frac{1}{2} \sum_{k = 1}^\infty \left(\frac{1}{2k}+\frac{1}{4k+1}+\frac{1}{8k+4}+\frac{1}{16k+12}\right) \frac{1}{16^k} .$$

(See more about Bailey–Borwein–Plouffe (BBP)-type representations.)

Applying the three general series for natural logarithm to 2 directly gives:

$$\ln 2 = \sum_{n = 1}^\infty \frac{(-1)^{n-1}}{n}.$$
$$\ln 2 = \sum_{n = 1}^\infty \frac{1}{2^{n}n}.$$
$$\ln 2 = \frac{2}{3} \sum_{k = 0}^\infty \frac{1}{9^{k}(2k+1)}.$$

Applying them to $\textstyle 2 = \frac{3}{2} \cdot \frac{4}{3}$ gives:

$$\ln 2 = \sum_{n = 1}^\infty \frac{(-1)^{n-1}}{2^n n} + \sum_{n = 1}^\infty \frac{(-1)^{n-1}}{3^n n} .$$
$$\ln 2 = \sum_{n = 1}^\infty \frac{1}{3^n n} + \sum_{n = 1}^\infty \frac{1}{4^n n} .$$
$$\ln 2 = \frac{2}{5} \sum_{k = 0}^\infty \frac{1}{25^{k}(2k+1)} + \frac{2}{7} \sum_{k = 0}^\infty \frac{1}{49^{k}(2k+1)} .$$

Applying them to $\textstyle 2 = (\sqrt{2})^2$ gives:

$$\ln 2 = 2 \sum_{n = 1}^\infty \frac{(-1)^{n-1}}{(\sqrt{2} + 1)^n n} .$$
$$\ln 2 = 2 \sum_{n = 1}^\infty \frac{1}{(2 + \sqrt{2})^n n} .$$
$$\ln 2 = \frac{4}{3 + 2 \sqrt{2}} \sum_{k = 0}^\infty \frac{1}{(17 + 12 \sqrt{2})^{k}(2k+1)} .$$

Applying them to $\textstyle 2 = { \left( \frac{16}{15} \right) }^{7} \cdot { \left( \frac{81}{80} \right) }^{3} \cdot { \left( \frac{25}{24} \right) }^{5}$ gives:

$$\ln 2 = 7 \sum_{n = 1}^\infty \frac{(-1)^{n-1}}{15^n n} + 3 \sum_{n = 1}^\infty \frac{(-1)^{n-1}}{80^n n} +  5 \sum_{n = 1}^\infty \frac{(-1)^{n-1}}{24^n n} .$$
$$\ln 2 = 7 \sum_{n = 1}^\infty \frac{1}{16^n n} + 3 \sum_{n = 1}^\infty \frac{1}{81^n n} +  5 \sum_{n = 1}^\infty \frac{1}{25^n n} .$$
$$\ln 2 = \frac{14}{31} \sum_{k = 0}^\infty \frac{1}{961^{k}(2k+1)} + \frac{6}{161} \sum_{k = 0}^\infty \frac{1}{25921^{k}(2k+1)} + \frac{10}{49} \sum_{k = 0}^\infty \frac{1}{2401^{k}(2k+1)} .$$

== Representation as integrals ==
The natural logarithm of 2 occurs frequently as the result of integration. Some explicit formulas for it include:

$$\int_0^1 \frac{dx}{1+x} = \int_1^2 \frac{dx}{x} = \ln 2$$

$$\int_0^\infty e^{-x}\frac{1-e^{-x}}{x} \, dx= \ln 2$$

$$\int_0^\infty 2^{-x} dx= \frac{1}{\ln 2}$$

$$\int_0^\frac{\pi}{3} \tan x \, dx=2\int_0^\frac{\pi}{4} \tan x \, dx = \ln 2$$

$$-\frac{1}{\pi i}\int_{0}^{\infty} \frac{\ln x \ln\ln x}{(x+1)^2} \, dx= \ln 2$$

== Other representations ==
The Pierce expansion is OEIS: A091846

$$\ln 2 = 1 -\frac{1}{1\cdot 3}+\frac{1}{1\cdot 3\cdot 12} -\cdots.$$

The Engel expansion is OEIS: A059180

$$\ln 2 = \frac{1}{2} + \frac{1}{2\cdot 3} + \frac{1}{2\cdot 3\cdot 7} + \frac{1}{2\cdot 3\cdot 7\cdot 9}+\cdots.$$

The cotangent expansion is OEIS: A081785

$$\ln 2 = \cot({\arccot(0) -\arccot(1) + \arccot(5) - \arccot(55) + \arccot(14187) -\cdots}).$$

The simple continued fraction expansion is OEIS: A016730

$$\ln 2 = \left[ 0; 1, 2, 3, 1, 6, 3, 1, 1, 2, 1, 1, 1, 1, 3, 10, 1, 1, 1, 2, 1, 1, 1, 1, 3, 2, 3, 1,...\right]$$,

which yields rational approximations, the first few of which are 0, 1, 2/3, 7/10, 9/13 and 61/88.

This generalized continued fraction:

$\ln 2 = \left[ 0;1,2,3,1,5,\tfrac{2}{3},7,\tfrac{1}{2},9,\tfrac{2}{5},...,2k-1,\frac{2}{k},...\right]$,
also expressible as
$$\ln 2 = \cfrac{1} {1+\cfrac{1} {2+\cfrac{1} {3+\cfrac{2} {2+\cfrac{2} {5+\cfrac{3} {2+\cfrac{3} {7+\cfrac{4} {2+\ddots}}}}}}}}
= \cfrac{2} {3-\cfrac{1^2} {9-\cfrac{2^2} {15-\cfrac{3^2} {21-\ddots}}}}$$

The following continued fraction representation (J.L.Lagrange) gives (asymptotically) 1.53 new correct decimal places per cycle:

$$\ln 2=\frac{\frac{1}{2}}{L_{0}}, L_{k}=2k+1+\frac{k+1}{2+\frac{k+1}{L_{k+1}}}$$

or

$$\ln 2=\frac{2}{G_{0}}, G_{k}=6k+3-\frac{(k+1)^2}{G_{k+1}}$$

== Bootstrapping other logarithms ==
Given a value of ln 2, a scheme of computing the logarithms of other integers is to tabulate the logarithms of the prime numbers and in the next layer the logarithms of the composite numbers c based on their factorizations

$$c=2^i3^j5^k7^l\cdots\rightarrow \ln(c)=i\ln(2)+j\ln(3)+k\ln(5)+l\ln(7)+\cdots$$

This employs

Prime	Approximate natural logarithm	OEIS
2	0.693147180559945309417232121458	A002162
3	1.09861228866810969139524523692	A002391
5	1.60943791243410037460075933323	A016628
7	1.94591014905531330510535274344	A016630
11	2.39789527279837054406194357797	A016634
13	2.56494935746153673605348744157	A016636
17	2.83321334405621608024953461787	A016640
19	2.94443897916644046000902743189	A016642
23	3.13549421592914969080675283181	A016646
29	3.36729582998647402718327203236	A016652
31	3.43398720448514624592916432454	A016654
37	3.61091791264422444436809567103	A016660
41	3.71357206670430780386676337304	A016664
43	3.76120011569356242347284251335	A016666
47	3.85014760171005858682095066977	A016670
53	3.97029191355212183414446913903	A016676
59	4.07753744390571945061605037372	A016682
61	4.11087386417331124875138910343	A016684
67	4.20469261939096605967007199636	A016690
71	4.26267987704131542132945453251	A016694
73	4.29045944114839112909210885744	A016696
79	4.36944785246702149417294554148	A016702
83	4.41884060779659792347547222329	A016706
89	4.48863636973213983831781554067	A016712
97	4.57471097850338282211672162170	A016720

In a third layer, the logarithms of rational numbers r = a/b are computed with ln(r) = ln(a) − ln(b), and logarithms of roots via ln ^{n}√c = 1/n ln(c).

The logarithm of 2 is useful in the sense that the powers of 2 are rather densely distributed; finding powers 2^{i} close to powers b^{j} of other numbers b is comparatively easy, and series representations of ln(b) are found by coupling 2 to b with logarithmic conversions.

=== Example ===
If p^{s} = q^{t} + d with some small d, then p^{s}/q^{t} = 1 + d/q^{t} and therefore

$$s\ln p -t\ln q = \ln\left(1+\frac{d}{q^t}\right) = \sum_{m=1}^\infty \frac{(-1)^{m+1}}{m}\left(\frac{d}{q^t}\right)^m = \sum_{n=0}^\infty \frac{2}{2n+1} {\left(\frac{d}{2 q^t + d}\right)}^{2n+1} .$$

Selecting q = 2 represents ln p by ln 2 and a series of a parameter d/q^{t} that one wishes to keep small for quick convergence. Taking 3^{2} = 2^{3} + 1, for example, generates

$$2\ln 3 = 3\ln 2 -\sum_{k\ge 1}\frac{(-1)^k}{8^{k}k} = 3\ln 2 + \sum_{n=0}^\infty \frac{2}{2n+1} {\left(\frac{1}{2 \cdot 8 + 1}\right)}^{2n+1} .$$

This is actually the third line in the following table of expansions of this type:

s	p	t	q	d/q^{t}
1	3	1	2	1/2 = 0.50000000…
1	3	2	2	−1/4 = −0.25000000…
2	3	3	2	1/8 = 0.12500000…
5	3	8	2	−13/256 = −0.05078125…
12	3	19	2	7153/524288 = 0.01364326…
1	5	2	2	1/4 = 0.25000000…
3	5	7	2	−3/128 = −0.02343750…
1	7	2	2	3/4 = 0.75000000…
1	7	3	2	−1/8 = −0.12500000…
5	7	14	2	423/16384 = 0.02581787…
1	11	3	2	3/8 = 0.37500000…
2	11	7	2	−7/128 = −0.05468750…
11	11	38	2	10433763667/274877906944 = 0.03795781…
1	13	3	2	5/8 = 0.62500000…
1	13	4	2	−3/16 = −0.18750000…
3	13	11	2	149/2048 = 0.07275391…
7	13	26	2	−4360347/67108864 = −0.06497423…
10	13	37	2	419538377/137438953472 = 0.00305254…
1	17	4	2	1/16 = 0.06250000…
1	19	4	2	3/16 = 0.18750000…
4	19	17	2	−751/131072 = −0.00572968…
1	23	4	2	7/16 = 0.43750000…
1	23	5	2	−9/32 = −0.28125000…
2	23	9	2	17/512 = 0.03320312…
1	29	4	2	13/16 = 0.81250000…
1	29	5	2	−3/32 = −0.09375000…
7	29	34	2	70007125/17179869184 = 0.00407495…
1	31	5	2	−1/32 = −0.03125000…
1	37	5	2	5/32 = 0.15625000…
4	37	21	2	−222991/2097152 = −0.10633039…
5	37	26	2	2235093/67108864 = 0.03330548…
1	41	5	2	9/32 = 0.28125000…
2	41	11	2	−367/2048 = −0.17919922…
3	41	16	2	3385/65536 = 0.05165100…
1	43	5	2	11/32 = 0.34375000…
2	43	11	2	−199/2048 = −0.09716797…
5	43	27	2	12790715/134217728 = 0.09529825…
7	43	38	2	−3059295837/274877906944 = −0.01112965…

Starting from the natural logarithm of q = 10 one might use these parameters:

s	p	t	q	d/q^{t}
10	2	3	10	3/125 = 0.02400000…
21	3	10	10	460353203/10000000000 = 0.04603532…
3	5	2	10	1/4 = 0.25000000…
10	5	7	10	−3/128 = −0.02343750…
6	7	5	10	17649/100000 = 0.17649000…
13	7	11	10	−3110989593/100000000000 = −0.03110990…
1	11	1	10	1/10 = 0.10000000…
1	13	1	10	3/10 = 0.30000000…
8	13	9	10	−184269279/1000000000 = −0.18426928…
9	13	10	10	604499373/10000000000 = 0.06044994…
1	17	1	10	7/10 = 0.70000000…
4	17	5	10	−16479/100000 = −0.16479000…
9	17	11	10	18587876497/100000000000 = 0.18587876…
3	19	4	10	−3141/10000 = −0.31410000…
4	19	5	10	30321/100000 = 0.30321000…
7	19	9	10	−106128261/1000000000 = −0.10612826…
2	23	3	10	−471/1000 = −0.47100000…
3	23	4	10	2167/10000 = 0.21670000…
2	29	3	10	−159/1000 = −0.15900000…
2	31	3	10	−39/1000 = −0.03900000…

== Known digits ==
This is a table of recent records in calculating digits of ln 2. As of December 2018, it has been calculated to more digits than any other natural logarithm of a natural number, except that of 1.

Date	Name	Number of digits
January 7, 2009	A.Yee & R.Chan	15,500,000,000
February 4, 2009	A.Yee & R.Chan	31,026,000,000
February 21, 2011	Alexander Yee	50,000,000,050
May 14, 2011	Shigeru Kondo	100,000,000,000
February 28, 2014	Shigeru Kondo	200,000,000,050
July 12, 2015	Ron Watkins	250,000,000,000
January 30, 2016	Ron Watkins	350,000,000,000
April 18, 2016	Ron Watkins	500,000,000,000
December 10, 2018	Michael Kwok	600,000,000,000
April 26, 2019	Jacob Riffee	1,000,000,000,000
August 19, 2020	Seungmin Kim	1,200,000,000,100
September 9, 2021	William Echols	1,500,000,000,000
February 12, 2024	Jordan Ranous	3,000,000,000,000
November 15, 2025	Mamdouh Barakat	3,100,000,000,000

== See also ==
- Rule of 72#Continuous compounding, in which ln 2 figures prominently
- Half-life#Formulas for half-life in exponential decay, in which ln 2 figures prominently
- Erdős–Moser equation: all solutions must come from a convergent of ln 2.
