= Amortizing loan =

Loan where the principal sum of the loan is paid down over the life of the loan

In banking and finance, an amortizing loan is a loan where the principal of the loan is paid down over the life of the loan (that is, amortized) according to an amortization schedule, typically through equal payments.

Similarly, an amortizing bond is a bond that repays part of the principal (face value) along with the coupon payments. Compare with a sinking fund, which amortizes the total debt outstanding by repurchasing some bonds.

Each payment to the lender will consist of a portion of interest and a portion of principal. Mortgage loans are typically amortizing loans. The calculations for an amortizing loan are those of an annuity using the time value of money formulas and can be done using an amortization calculator.

An amortizing loan should be contrasted with a bullet loan, where a large portion of the loan will be paid at the final maturity date instead of being paid down gradually over the loan's life.

An accumulated amortization loan represents the amount of amortization expense that has been claimed since the acquisition of the asset.

== Effects ==
Amortization of debt has two major effects:

Credit risk
First and most importantly, it substantially reduces the credit risk of the loan or bond. In a bullet loan (or bullet bond), the bulk of the credit risk is in the repayment of the principal at maturity, at which point the debt must either be paid off in full or rolled over. By paying off the principal over time, this risk is mitigated.

Interest rate risk
A secondary effect is that amortization reduces the duration of the debt, reducing the debt's sensitivity to interest rate risk, as compared to debt with the same maturity and coupon rate. This is because there are smaller payments in the future, so the weighted-average maturity of the cash flows is lower.

== Equated monthly installment ==
In EMI or Equated Monthly Installments, payments are divided into equal amounts for the duration of the loan, making it the simplest repayment model. A greater amount of the payment is applied to interest at the beginning of the amortization schedule, while more money is applied to principal at the end.

This is captured by the formula

$$P \,=\,A\cdot\frac{1-\left(\frac{1}{1+r}\right)^{n} }{r}$$

or, equivalently,

$$A \,=\,P\cdot\frac{r(1 + r)^n}{(1 + r)^n - 1}$$

where: P is the principal amount borrowed, A is the periodic amortization payment, r is the periodic interest rate divided by 100 (nominal annual interest rate also divided by 12 in case of monthly installments), and n is the total number of payments (for a 30-year loan with monthly payments n = 30 × 12 = 360).

== Negative amortization ==
Negative amortization (also called deferred interest) occurs if the payments made do not cover the interest due. The remaining interest owed is added to the outstanding loan balance, making it larger than the original loan amount.

If the repayment model for a loan is "fully amortized", then the last payment (which, if the schedule was calculated correctly, should be equal to all others) pays off all remaining principal and interest on the loan. If the repayment model on a loan is not fully amortized, then the last payment due may be a large balloon payment of all remaining principal and interest. If the borrower lacks the funds or assets to immediately make that payment, or adequate credit to refinance the balance into a new loan, the borrower may end up in default.

== Weighted-average life ==
The number weighted average of the times of the principal repayments of an amortizing loan is referred to as the weighted-average life (WAL), also called "average life". It's the average time until a dollar of principal is repaid.

In a formula,

$$\text{WAL} = \sum_{i=1}^n \frac {P_i}{P} t_i,$$

where:

- $P$ is the principal,
- $P_i$ is the principal repayment in coupon $i$, hence
- $\frac{P_i}{P}$ is the fraction of the principal repaid in coupon $i$, and
- $t_i$ is the time from the start to coupon $i$.

== See also ==
- Amortization calculator
- Amortization schedule
- Amortization (accounting)
- Sinking fund
- Weighted-Average Life
