= Index of real estate articles =

This aims to be a complete list of the articles on real estate.

== # ==
- 72-hour clause

== A ==
- Abandonment
- Abstract of title
- Acceleration clause
- Accession
- Acknowledgment
- Acre – a measure of land area
- Action to quiet title
- Ad valorem tax
- ADA
- Adjustable-rate mortgage (ARM)
- Adjusted basis
- Administrator/Administratrix
- Adverse possession
- Agency – Real estate agency, Buyer brokerage
- Agent – Real estate agent or broker, Estate agent
- Agreement
- Air rights
- Alienation
- Allodial, Allodium
- Allodial title
- Alluvion
- Amenity
- American Land Title Association (ALTA)
- Americans with Disabilities Act of 1990
- Amortization calculator
- Amortization schedule
- Amortizing loan
- Anchor store
- Annexation
- Annual percentage rate
- Apartment
- Appraisal, real estate
- Appraised value – An estimate of the present worth of a property
- Appreciation
- APR
- Appurtenance
- Appurtenant easement
- ARELLO
- Arm's length transaction
- Arrears
- Article 4 of the United States Constitution
- Artificial person
- Asking price
- Assemblage
- Assignee
- Assignment
- Assignment of contract
- Assignor
- Assessed value – The value set upon a property for taxation purposes
- Assessment
- Association of Real Estate License Law Officials (ARELLO)
- Assumable loan
- Assumable mortgage
- Attorney-at-law
- Attorney-in-fact
- Auction
- Avulsion
- Assessor
- Assumption of mortgage

== B ==
- Balance
- Balloon mortgage
- Bargain-and-sale deed
- Baseline – a line that is a base for measurement or construction, lines that divide north/south or east/west in surveying
- Basis
- Benchmark
- Beneficiary
- Bequest
- Bhoodan movement
- Bilateral contract – a contract in which only one party makes a promise
- Bill of sale
- Binder – In law, a binder (also known as an agreement for sale, earnest money contract, memorandum of sale, or contract to sell) is a short-form preliminary contract in which the purchaser agrees to buy and the seller agrees to sell certain real estate under stated terms and conditions, usually in the form of a purchase offer, and is enforceable in a court of law and used to secure a real estate transaction until a more formal, fully negotiated contract of sale can be signed. See offer and acceptance.
- Blanket loan, Blanket mortgage
- Block
- Blockbusting
- Boiler insurance
- Bona fide purchaser
- Book value
- Boot
- Boundary
- Breach of contract
- Broker
- Brokerage – Mortgage broker, Real estate broker, Buyer brokerage
- Broker's Price Opinion (BPO)
- BPO Standards and Guidelines
- Budget
- Building code
- Bundle of rights
- Buyer brokerage
- Buyer's agent

== C ==
- Canadian Real Estate Association (CREA)
- Capital appreciation
- Capital gain
- Cap rate, Capitalization rate
- Cash flow
- Caveat emptor
- Certificate of occupancy
- Certified Relocation and Transition Specialist
- Chain – sequence of linked house purchases
- Chain – unit of measurement
- Chain of title
- Chattel
- Chattel mortgage
- City block
- Civil action
- Civil Rights Act of 1866
- Civil Rights Act of 1968
- Clause
- Client
- Closing costs
- Closing
- Closing statement
- Cloud on a title, Cloud on title
- Coinsurance, Coinsurance clause
- Collateral
- Color of title
- Commercial property
- Commingling
- Commission
- Comprehensive planning for community development
- Confiscation
- Commitment
- Common area
- Common law
- Community-based planning
- Community land trust
- Community planning
- Community property
- Comparables
- Compensatory damages, Expectation damages
- Competition
- Condemnation – building is deemed no longer habitable, government seizure through Eminent domain, or Urban decay
- Condominium
- Condominium conversion, Condo conversion
- Confidentiality, Confidential information
- Conformity
- Conservation land trust
- Consideration
- Construction loan, Construction mortgage
- Constructive eviction
- Consumer
- Contingency, Contingencies
- Continuing education requirement
- Contour map
- Contract for deed
- Contract of sale
- Contract
- Contribution
- Conventional mortgage
- Conversion – removal of personal property or building fixtures
- Conversion – process of changing a building to condominium
- Courtesy signing
- Covenants
- Convey, Conveyance, Conveyancing
- Cooling-off period
- Cooperating broker
- Cooperative apartment
- Co-op
- Co-ownership
- Copyhold
- Corporation
- Corporeal property
- Corrective maintenance
- Cost basis
- Council housing
- Counteroffer
- Courtesy tenure
- Covenant
- Covenant Against Encumbrances
- Covenant for Further Assurances
- Covenant of Quiet Enjoyment
- Covenant of Right to Convey
- Covenant of Seisin
- Covenant of Warranty
- CREA
- Credit
- Creditor
- Cul-de-sac
- Customer

== D ==
- Damages for breach of contract
- Datum
- Debit
- Debt service coverage ratio
- Decedent
- Declaration of Condominium
- Declaration of Restriction
- Decree
- Deductible expense
- Deed
- Deed in bargain and sale
- Deed in lieu of foreclosure
- Deed in trust
- Deed of gift
- Deed of trust
- Deed restriction
- Default
- Defeasance clause
- Defeasible fee
- Defeasible estate
- Deficiency – physical condition or construction that is considered sub-standard or below minimum expectations
- Deficiency judgment
- Delivery and acceptance
- Demise
- Department of Housing and Urban Development (HUD)
- Depreciable asset
- Depreciated value
- Depreciation
- Descent
- Designated agency, Designated agent
- Devise – disposal of real property in a will and testament, or the property itself which has been disposed of
- Devisee – beneficiary of a will and testament
- Disability
- Discount points
- Disintermediation
- Documentary stamp
- Documentary stamp tax
- Domania
- Dominant estate, Dominant tenement
- Dominant portion
- Dominion Land Survey
- Double closing
- Double escrow
- Dower
- Dual agent, Dual agency
- Due-on-sale clause
- Duress

== E ==
- Earnest money
- Earthquake insurance
- Easement
- Easement appurtenant
- Easement by condemnation
- Easement by implication
- Easement by necessity
- Easement by prescription
- Easement in gross
- ECOA
- Economic depression
- Economic rent
- Effective demand
- Effective interest rate
- Egress
- Egress window
- Ejectment
- Ejido
- Emblements
- Eminent domain
- Enabling act
- Encroachment
- Encumbrance
- Endorsement – signature on a contract thereby indicating the person's intent to become a party to the contract
- Enforceable
- Environmental Protection Agency
- Equal Credit Opportunity Act (ECOA)
- Equitable title
- Equity
- Equity of redemption
- Escheat
- Escrow
- Escrow account
- Escrow agent
- Escrow instructions
- Escrow payment
- Estate – legal term for a person's net worth at any point in time alive or dead
- Estate – a very large property (such as country house or mansion) with houses, outbuildings, gardens, supporting farmland, and woods
- Estate agent
- Estate for years
- Estate manager
- Estate tax
- Estoppel
- Et al.
- Et ux., Et uxor
- Et vir
- Evaluation
- Eviction
- Exclusive agency
- Exclusive right to sell
- Executed contract
- Execution
- Executor
- Executory contract
- Executrix
- Exempt – Grandfather clause that allows a pre-existing condition to continue, Tax exemption that legally excludes income or other value to reduce taxable income
- Exercise of option
- Expectation damages
- Express contract
- Extended coverage

== F ==
- Fair Housing Act of 1968
- Fair Housing Amendments Act of 1988
- Fair market value
- Fannie Mae
- Fed, the
- Freddie Mac
- Federal Home Loan Mortgage Corporation (FHLMC or Freddie Mac)
- Federal Housing Administration (FHA)
- Federal National Mortgage Association (FNMA or Fannie Mae)
- Federal Real Estate Board
- Federal Reserve System
- Fee simple
- Fee simple absolute
- Fee simple determinable
- Fee simple subject to condition subsequent
- Feudal system as applicable to real estate
- FHA
- FHA-insured loan
- Field Card
- Financial Institutions Reform, Recovery, and Enforcement Act of 1989 (FIRREA)
- Fire insurance
- FIRREA
- First mortgage – as opposed to Second mortgage
- Fixed-rate mortgage
- Fixer-upper
- Fixture
- Flat-fee MLS
- Flipping
- Flood hazard area
- Flood insurance
- Foreclosure
- Four unities
- Fraud
- Freehold
- Freehold estate
- For Sale By Owner
- FSBO
- Functional obsolescence
- Future interest

== G ==
- General plan
- General warranty deed
- Gentrification
- Ginnie Mae
- GNMA
- Good faith estimate
- Government National Mortgage Association (GNMA or Ginnie Mae)
- Graduated payment mortgage
- Gramdan
- Grant bargain and sale deed
- Grant
- Grant deed
- Grantee
- Grantor
- Green belt
- Ground lease
- Ground rent

== H ==
- Habendum clause
- Habitable
- Hard money
- Hard money lenders
- Hard money loan
- Hazard insurance
- Heirs, Heirs and assigns
- Hereditament
- Heterogeneous
- Highest and best use
- (HOA)
- Holographic will
- Home construction loan
- Home equity line of credit (HELOC)
- Home rule
- Home-equity debt
- Home equity loan
- Home inspection – especially Home buyers inspection before closing or Pre-delivery inspection of new construction
- Homeowners association (HOA)
- Homeowner's insurance
- Homeowner's policy
- Home warranty
- Homestead
- Homestead exemption
- Homogeneous
- Housing association
- Housing bubble
- Housing tenure
- Housing and Urban Development (HUD)
- Housing cooperative
- HUD
- HUD-1 Settlement Statement
- Hypothecation

== I ==
- IBC
- Illusory offer, Illusory promise
- ILSA
- ILSFDA
- Immobility – immovable real estate
- Immovable property
- Implied contract
- Implied warranty
- Improved land
- Improvements – Home improvement or Land improvement
- Inspection
- Income approach for appraisal
- Income property – real estate rented out to provide income for the landlord
- Income shelter
- Incompetent
- Incorporeal property
- Indemnification
- Ingress
- Inheritance tax
- Injunction
- Installment land contract
- Installment sale
- Interest rate
- International Building Code (IBC)
- Internet Data Exchange (IDX)
- Instrument
- Insurable interest
- Interest
- Interstate Land Sales Full Disclosure Act of 1968 (ILSFDA or ILSA)
- Intestate
- Intestate succession
- Invalid
- Investing in real estate – Real estate investing, Real estate investment club, Flipping property
- Investment
- Investment rating for real estate
- Investment value
- Involuntary alienation
- Firm offer

== J ==
- Jeonse
- Joint and several liability
- Joint tenancy
- Joint venture
- Judgment
- Judgment lien
- Judicial foreclosure
- Junior mortgage – smaller mortgage in addition to the primary mortgage; examples: second mortgage, 80-15-5 piggy-back loan, and home equity loan
- Jurisdiction

== K ==
- Key money

== L ==
- Laches
- Land
- Land bank, Land banking
- Land contract
- Land grant
- Land lease
- Land registration
- Land tenure
- Land Trust Alliance
- Land trust
- Landlocked
- Landlord
- Law of agency
- Lawful
- Lease
- Lease option
- Leaseback
- Leasehold
- Leasehold estate
- Legal capacity
- Legal description
- Legal entity
- Legal personality
- Legal interest rate – the opposite of Usury
- Lenders mortgage insurance
- Lessee
- Lessor
- Leverage
- Levy – a fine as penalty, seizure of debtor's property after judgment, financial charge such as tax
- Licensee
- Lien
- Lienee – property owner who grants the lien
- Lienor – person who benefit from the lien
- Lien holder – person who benefit from the lien
- Life estate
- Life tenant – owner of a life estate
- Like-kind property exchange
- Limited liability company (LLC)
- Limited partnership
- Liquidated damages
- Liquidation value
- Lis pendens
- Listing contract
- Litigation
- Littoral rights
- LLC
- LMI
- Loan origination fee
- Loan-to-value ratio (LTV)
- Location
- Lot
- Lot and Block survey system
- LTV

== M ==
- Market
- Market analysis
- Market value
- Marketable title
- Master plan for community development
- Masters of Real Estate Development
- Material fact
- Materialman's lien
- Mechanic's lien
- Meeting of minds
- Menace
- Merger
- Metes and bounds
- Mill
- Millage tax
- Mineral lease
- Mineral rights
- Mini dorm
- Ministerial act
- Minor
- MIP
- Misrepresentation
- MLS
- Mortgage
- Mortgage Account Error Correction, see Real Estate Settlement Procedures Act
- Mortgage assumption
- Mortgage bank, Mortgage banker
- MGIC
- Mortgage insurance premium (MIP)
- Mortgage loan
- Mortgage broker
- Mortgage Guaranty Insurance Corporation (MGIC)
- Mortgage insurance
- Mortgagee – borrower
- Mortgagor – lender
- Multiple Listing Service (MLS)
- Mutual agreement
- Mutual assent
- Mutual mistake
- Mutual savings bank

== N ==
- NAEA
- NAR
- NAREB
- National Association of Estate Agents (NAEA)
- National Association of Real Estate Brokers (NAREB)
- National Association of Realtors (NAR)
- National Environmental Policy Act (NEPA)
- National Flood Insurance Program
- Negative amortization
- Negligence
- NEPA
- Net income
- Net lease
- Net operating income
- Notary Public
- Note
- Niche real estate
- Nonconforming use
- Notice of lis pendens
- Novation
- Null and void

== O ==
- Obligee
- Obligor
- Obsolescence
- Offer
- Offer and acceptance
- Offeree
- Offeror
- Open listing or Open agency
- Operation of law
- Option
- Ordinance
- OREO
- Origination fee
- Other Real Estate Owned (OREO)
- Outdated
- Overimprovement – building and land improvements that far surpass other local properties
- Owner-occupancy
- Ownership

== P ==
- Parol evidence rule
- Participation mortgage
- Partition
- Partnership
- Party wall
- Peak land value intersection
- Perc test, Percolation test
- Percolation
- Personal property
- PITI
- Planned community
- Plat
- Pledge
- Plottage
- PLSS
- PMI
- Pocket listing
- Points
- Police power
- Population density
- Positive misrepresentation
- Power of attorney
- Pre-delivery inspection
- Prepaid expenses
- Prepayment penalty
- Prescription
- Prescriptive easement
- Preventive maintenance
- Price fixing
- Pricing
- Prima facie
- Prima facie case
- Primary residence
- Prime rate
- Principal – the amount of money owed on a mortgage loan
- Principal meridian
- Principal residence
- Private equity real estate
- Private mortgage insurance (PMI)
- Private property
- Privity of contract
- Probate
- Profit à prendre
- Promissory note
- Promulgate, Promulgation
- Property management
- Property manager
- Proration
- Provision
- Public housing
- Public property
- Public Land Survey System (PLSS)
- Public record
- Public utility
- Punitive damages
- Pur autre vie

== Q ==
- Quarter section
- Quiet enjoyment
- Quiet title
- Quiet title action
- Quiet title proceeding
- Quitclaim deed

== R ==
- Racial steering
- Rate of return
- Ratification
- Ratify
- Rating for real estate investment
- Real estate
- Real estate agency
- Real estate agent
- Real estate appraisal (property valuation, land valuation)
- Real estate benchmarking
- Real estate broker
- Real estate brokerage
- Real estate bubble
- Real estate contract
- Real estate development
- Real estate economics
- Real estate investment trust (REIT)
- Real Estate Owned (REO)
- Real estate salesperson
- Real Estate Settlement Procedures Act (RESPA)
- Real estate trading
- Real estate trends
- Real property
- Realtor
- Recording
- Recourse note
- Recovery and Enforcement Act (Financial Institutions Reform, Recovery, and Enforcement Act of 1989, FIRREA)
- Redemption
- Redlining
- Refinancing
- Regress
- Regulation Z
- REIT
- Reject
- Remainder
- Remainderman
- Remise
- Rent
- Rent-back agreement, Rent-back clause
- REO
- Replacement cost, Replacement value
- Repossession
- Rescission
- Resident manager – Estate manager, Property manager, Building superintendent
- Residual income
- Restrictive covenant
- Revaluation of fixed assets
- Reverse mortgage, Reverse annuity mortgage
- Reversion
- Reversionary interest
- Revocation
- RICS
- Right of first refusal
- Right of redemption
- Right of survivorship
- Right to emblements
- Riparian rights, Riparian water rights
- Risk management
- Royal Institution of Chartered Surveyors (RICS)
- Run with the land

== S ==
- S corporation
- Sale and leaseback
- Sales contract
- Salesperson – Estate agent, Real estate agent
- Salvage value
- SAM
- Savings and loan association
- Scarcity
- Scavenger sale
- Second mortgage
- Secondary mortgage
- Secondary mortgage market
- Section – unit of land: 640 acres in the U.S., 1 square mile plots in Western Canada, the Alberta Township System
- Securitization
- Security deposit
- Seisin
- Seizing
- Self-build mortgage
- Seller agency
- Separate property
- Servient estate, Servient tenement
- Setback
- Settlement costs
- Settlement statement
- Settlement
- Shared appreciation mortgage (SAM)
- Sheriff's deed
- Situs
- Sole proprietorship
- Special agent – person acting under a Power of attorney
- Special assessment, Special assessment tax
- Special warranty deed
- Special flood hazard area
- Specific performance
- Speculation
- Spot zoning
- Squatter's rights
- Starker exchange, Starker Trust
- Starter home
- Statute of Frauds
- Statute of limitations
- Statutory foreclosure
- Steering
- Stigmatized property
- Straight–line depreciation
- Strata title
- Strict foreclosure
- Style obsolescence
- Sub-agent
- Subdivision
- Subdivision lot block and tract
- Subject-to
- Sublease
- Sublet
- Subordination
- Subordination agreement
- Supply and demand
- Survivorship
- Sweat equity

== T ==
- Tacking
- Tax assessment
- Tax basis
- Tax credit
- Tax sale
- Tax shelter
- Tax-deductible expense
- Tax-deferred exchange
- Tenancy by the entirety
- Tenancy in common
- Tenant
- Tenements
- Testate – opposite of Intestate
- Testator
- Testatrix
- Theory of value
- TILA
- Timeshare
- Title
- Title insurance
- Torrens title
- Truth in Lending Act of 1968 (TILA)
- Township
- Tract
- Trespasser
- Trust deed
- Trust deed investment company
- Trust
- Trustee
- Trustor

== U ==
- UCC
- Underimprovement – building and land improvements that are far below the level of other local properties
- Underwriting
- Undisclosed principal
- Undivided interest
- Undue influence
- Unencumbered property – a property without any encumbrance
- Unenforceable contract
- Uniform Commercial Code (UCC)
- Uniform Standards of Professional Appraisal Practice (USPAP)
- Uniform Vendor and Purchaser Risk Act (UVPRA)
- Unilateral contract – contract in which all parties make promises
- Unintentional misrepresentation – also called innocent misrepresentation
- Unities
- Unlike-kind property exchange – opposite of Like-kind exchange
- USPAP
- United States housing bubble
- Urban renewal
- Urban sprawl
- Urban Land Institute
- Usufruct
- Usury
- Utility

== V ==
- VA loan
- Valuable consideration
- Valuation
- Value in exchange
- Value in use
- Value theory
- Value
- Variance
- Vendee – buyer of goods or services
- Vendor – supplier/seller of goods or services
- Vicarious liability
- Void contract
- Voidable contract
- Voluntary alienation

== W ==
- Warranty deed
- Warranty of title
- Waste
- Water right
- With reserve – in an auction, the price ("reservation price" or "reserve") below which the seller will not sell the item/property
- Words of conveyance
- Wraparound mortgage
- Writ of attachment

== Y ==
- Yield
- Yield spread premium

== Z ==
- Zoning
- Zoning map
- Zoning ordinance – local ordinance that controls land use and buildings
