= Foreclosure investment =

Foreclosure investment refers to the process of investing capital in the public sale of a mortgaged property following foreclosure of the loan secured by that property.

In real estate, foreclosure is the termination of the equity of redemption of a mortgagor or the grantee in the property covered by the mortgage. Depending on the type of foreclosure proceeding, the sale may be administered by the courts (judicial foreclosure) or by an appointed trustee (statutory foreclosure). Proceeds from the sale are used to satisfy the claims of the mortgagee primarily, with any excess going to the mortgagor. Anyone may bid on properties sold at a foreclosure sale. As a practical matter, however, most properties are acquired by the lender, often for the amount owed on the foreclosed loan.

When interest rates rise, home owners with variable interest rates often become over-extended, providing opportunities for foreclosure investment professionals to obtain investment properties at depressed prices. The most common reason for foreclosure is dissolution of a marriage, followed by a failed business venture. Foreclosure investing can provide favorable returns; in February 2011, foreclosed homes accounted for 39% of home sales in the United States, most to investors.

== Stages of foreclosure ==
The foreclosure process begins when a financially distressed homeowner fails to make a loan payment and is served with a summons from his or her creditors. After service, papers will be filed with the county clerk's office and be made a matter of public record (in some areas the place where deeds and mortgages are registered may go by a different name, such as the office of the land registrar). This notice is usually known as Lis Pendens, which is Latin for "pending legal action". At this point, any attempts by the homeowner to borrow from public credit sources will be met with a negative response. This stage is called pre-foreclosure, and during this stage, a homeowner has a few ways to avoid foreclosure. One of the ways to avoid a foreclosure is to short sell their property and pay off their outstanding mortgage. A pre-foreclosure short sale can be a good opportunity for investors to buy a property at a discount directly from a financially distressed homeowner. On completion of the publication process, the foreclosure action will be permitted to proceed and the owners have a limited amount of time to pay up, sell, or make other deals with creditors. If none of these actions are taken, a foreclosure sale will take place. If no one bids the amount owed, the property reverts to the lender and becomes a real estate owned property held in inventory by the lender. Experienced foreclosure investors may work in all of these various stages, but the possibility of making a transaction with the homeowner is no longer possible after the property is REO.

Often, foreclosure investment can take place before the actual foreclosure process begins through a pre-foreclosure sale. This scenario occurs when the homeowner attempts to sell a property before being foreclosed upon, often "short-selling" for less than they owe but more than they believe they would recover in a foreclosure.

== See also ==
- Deed in lieu of foreclosure
- Foreclosure
- Foreclosure consultant
- Housing bubble
- Index of real estate articles
- Investment rating for real estate
- Real estate pricing
- Real estate appraisal
- Real estate economics
