= Real estate license =

Certificate in real estate

A real estate license is an authorization issued by a government body to give agents and brokers the legal authority to represent a home seller or buyer in a real estate transaction. Real estate agents and real estate brokers are required to be licensed when conducting real estate transactions in the United States and in a small number of other countries.

== In the United States ==
In the United States, each state specifies a mandatory education - completing this allows prospective agents to become eligible to receive a real estate license. This involves completing a pre-licensing education from an institution accredited by the state and passing an exam. The real estate exam is often considered difficult by many aspiring real estate agents and brokers. This is because the exam is intentionally designed to be difficult to pass, as a way to filter out those who may not have the required skills and knowledge to be successful as a real estate professional.

Additionally, to maintain a real estate license, states require a continuing education program to be completed by licensees typically every two years. Each state has their own timeline requirements.

Through a complicated arrangement, the National Association of Realtors (NAR), a trade and lobbying group for agents and brokers, sets policies for most of the multiple listing services. As the Internet gained widespread use in the late 1990s, NAR created regulations allowing Information Data Exchanges (or Internet Data Exchanges) (IDX) whereby brokers would allow a portion of their data, such as listings of homes for sale, to be seen online via brokers' or agents' websites.

The association attempted to limit online access to some or all of that data, particularly by brokers operating solely on the Internet. The Department of Justice brought an antitrust lawsuit against the NAR trade group in 2005. The complaint accused the association of unfairly limiting access to the multiple listing service (MLS), which effectively prevented online brokerages from competing with traditional brick-and-mortar offices. The Justice Department accused the NAR of conspiring to restrain trade.

=== License reciprocity agreements ===
Some U.S. states have reciprocity agreements in place allowing licensees from other states to become licensed in that state. Details of each reciprocal agreement vary from state to state. States vary greatly, each State has its own definition of "reciprocity," along with their own requirements for obtaining a reciprocal license. Some states have education requirements that must be met by the agent while others require only that the agent fills out a reciprocal license application with the State.

== See also ==
- Housing bubble
- List of real estate topics
- Real estate appraisal
- Real estate economics
- Real estate industry trade groups
- Real estate pricing
- Real property
- Real estate trends
