= Real estate transaction =

Transfer of property rights

A real estate transaction is the process whereby rights in a unit of property (or designated real estate) are transferred between two or more parties, e.g. in the case of conveyance one party being the seller(s) and the other being the buyer(s). It can often be quite complicated due to the complexity of the property rights being transferred, the amount of money being exchanged, and government regulations. Conventions and requirements also vary considerably among different countries of the world and smaller legal entities (jurisdictions).

In more abstract terms, a real estate transaction, like other financial transactions, causes transaction costs. To identify and possibly reduce these transaction costs, the Organisation for Economic Co-operation and Development (OECD) addressed the issue through a study commissioned by the European Commission, and through a research action.

The mentioned research action 'Modelling Real Property Transactions' investigated methods to describe selected transactions formally, to allow for comparisons across countries / jurisdictions. Descriptions were performed both using a more simple format, a Basic Use Case template, and more advanced applications of the Unified Modelling Language. Process models were compared through an ontology-based methodology, and national property transaction costs were estimated for Finland and Denmark, based on the directions of the United Nations System of National Accounts.

Real estate transactions: subdivision, conveyance, and mortgaging, as they are performed in the five Nordic countries are described in some detail. A translation into English is available for the Danish part.

== Residential examples ==
=== United States and Canada ===
The sale of a house in the United States or Canada might involve some or all of the following steps:

- Hiring of a real estate broker the seller and handle the logistics of the advertising and sale, except for "for sale by owner" properties where the owner(s) may consult legal counsel or obtain copies of a real estate contract.
- A buyer may enter the picture in a variety of ways: from seeing advertisements in the media, seeing signs outside a property, or contacting a real estate agent to see a property.
- A buyer may engage the services of a real estate broker to represent her/him and handle the logistics of finding suitable properties, enabling him/her to become qualified to buy, and the showing of appropriate properties.
- Advertisement of the price and property details with a Multiple Listing Service, newspaper or web classified listing, lawn sign, or poster in the real estate office.
- Private showings or general open house for interested buyers or buyers' real estate agents.
- Interested buyers may get pre-approval for a mortgage of a certain amount from a bank, if they cannot afford the full purchase price in the range they are exploring.
- Preparation of a written offer to purchase. If prepared by a real estate agent on behalf of the buyer, it is generally done on pre-printed and legally-approved forms provided by the real estate broker's office. An agent representing the buyer will advise his/her client as to the value of including specific contingency clauses such as time to obtain a mortgage commitment or to arrange for inspections.
- Upon acceptance of the sales contract, the buyer opens an escrow. An escrow commonly includes a signed agreement between the two parties plus an earnest money payment check which accompanies the offer, and which is generally not deposited until all parties are in agreement. The escrow deposited then leads the seller to more property disclosures, inspections and conditions removal. This also leads to title search and further title reporting.
- Submission of offers by interested buyers. Multiple offers may result in bidding, with best offer (not necessarily the highest bid) being awarded the sale. A single offer may often be below the initial asking price, resulting in negotiation between the buyer and seller over the final price, or possibly the rejection of the offer by the seller. When the seller refuses to negotiate with any buyer with a bid that is lower than the initial asking price, the situation is known as a holdout.
- After acceptance of a particular offer, a real estate contract is ratified by all parties. It usually creates a short interim period (typically no more than 30 days, often much less) to allow the buyer to thoroughly inspect the property (often with the assistance of a professional home inspector).
- Some states, such as New York, require that a seller provide a property condition disclosure statement to the buyer outlining in detail the full condition of the property.
- Depending upon the jurisdiction and traditional practice, a title search is then ordered from a third party settlement or escrow company, pending final settlement.
- An Appraisal, commissioned, as per custom, by the buyer or seller to determine the value of the building and land to satisfy the lender.
- Depending upon how the contingency paragraphs are worded, if any defects are discovered during the inspection, the buyer may ask that they be repaired, ask that the sale price be lowered, or choose not to purchase the property.
- The closing of the sale ends the escrow period and completes the transfer of ownership to the buyer. At this time, and all monies change hands and a number of closing costs are paid by the buyer or seller.
- If a real estate broker is used in the transaction, closing is the time that payment is made to the brokers involved.

== See also ==
- Listing contract
