= Acknowledgment (law) =

In law, an acknowledgment is a declaration or avowal of one's own act, used to authenticate legal instruments, which may give the instrument legal validity, and works to prevent the recording of false instruments or fraudulent executions. Acknowledgment involves a public official, frequently a notary public. The party executing the legal instrument orally declares that the instrument is his or her act or deed, and the official prepares a certificate attesting to the declaration.

Acknowledgments are distinct from jurats, verifications, and attestations. A jurat differs from an acknowledgment in that a jurat lacks the statement that the instrument is the act or deed of the party executing it. A verification is distinct in that it seeks to verify the factual contents of the instrument, rather than the instrument itself. Finally, an attestation occurs where a third person gives his or her name as a witness to the actual execution of an instrument. Normally, acknowledgments only serve evidentiary purposes, but some jurisdictions have made acknowledgment a requirement for recording of instruments.

== See also ==
- List of real estate topics
