= RMLS =

RMLS may refer to:

- Rifled muzzle loader, a mid-19th century artillery piece
- Regional Multiple Listing Service, a tool employed by real estate brokers
- Regional or Minority Languages, as defined in the European Charter for Regional or Minority Languages
- Remote Mine-Laying System, a type of artillery for the dispersal of anti-tank mines.
