= Grant deed =

A grant deed is used in some states and jurisdictions for the sale or other transfer of real property from one person or entity to another person or entity. Each party transferring an interest in the property, or "grantor", is required to sign it. The signatures must be acknowledged before a notary public (notarized) or other official authorized by law to administer oaths.

The grantor of a grant deed makes two guarantees to the grantee: 1) The grantor/seller guarantees that the property has not been sold to anyone else, and 2) That the house is not under any liens or restrictions that have not already been disclosed to the buyer/grantee. This assures grantee there are no legal claims to the property by third parties, and no taxes are owed on the property that would restrict its sale.

Some jurisdictions use the warranty deed to transfer real property instead of the grant deed. The warranty deed adds the additional guarantee that the grantor will defend the title against any third-party claim. The quitclaim deed is also sometimes used, although this document is most often used to disclaim any interest in a property rather than selling a property that one owns.

A grant deed includes a detailed property description, which helps avoid confusion or disputes regarding the boundaries and characteristics of the property being transferred. Precision in identifying the specific parcel of property being transferred is crucial to minimize misunderstandings and ensure that both parties are clear about the transaction.

Grant deeds strike a balance between protection and simplicity. They use precise and unambiguous language to ensure clarity and understanding, and they include warranties that offer protection against future claims on the property.

Grant deeds require full disclosure of any encumbrances on the property, such as liens or restrictions. This transparency allows grantees to make informed decisions before finalizing the transaction.

The extensive guarantees and protections offered by grant deeds include assurances of the grantor's legal authority to transfer ownership, the absence of undisclosed claims or encumbrances on the property, and protection against defects in title.

Understanding liens and encumbrances is important in real estate transactions. Grant deeds play a pivotal role in providing transparency about these potential obstacles and safeguarding the interests of both buyers and sellers.

The types of deeds that are now used to transfer real property are a relatively modern invention. Previously, the grantor transferred the property to the buyer, called the "grantee", by performing some commonly recognized deed, such as picking up a handful of soil of the property to be transferred, handing it to the buyer, and reciting legally prescribed words that acknowledged the transfer in the presence of witnesses. This was called livery of seisin. Over time, and particularly with the development of modern technology that permits government offices to keep accurate copies of documents, the physical deed that was formerly performed in order to transfer a property was replaced by the paper deed, also known as a deed poll, that is now commonly used.

== See also ==
- Deed
