= Peter G. Miller =

American journalist and author

- Born: Peter G. Miller; Manhattan, New York City, U.S.
- Citizenship: American
- Education: American University
- Occupations: Journalist, author
- Known for: Real estate journalism Mortgage analysis Creator and host of the AOL Real Estate Desk
- Notable work: The Common-Sense Mortgage; Successful Real Estate Investing; Buy Your First Home Now; How to Sell Your Home in Any Market; Inside The Real Estate Deal; Media Marketing

Peter G. Miller, also known as Peter Miller, is a veteran American journalist and author.

== Early life ==
Miller was born in Manhattan. He was raised in his early years in Manhattan and on a farm in Brewster, NY. The family later moved to northern New Jersey.

As a teenager, Miller worked during the summers at Camp Reinberg in Palatine, IL and the Herald Tribune Fresh Air Fund camp in Milan, NY (The Herald Tribune Fresh Air Fund was later supported by The New York Times. It is known now as the Fresh Air Fund).

While in high school, Miller wrote letters to major New York City newspapers, some which were published. This led to an interest in journalism and public affairs.

== Education ==
Miller is a graduate of the American University in Washington, DC. He holds a BA in journalism, an MS in public relations, and a Graduate Certificate of Government Public Information.

== Military service ==
Miller enlisted in the Army National Guard as a college sophomore. His unit was federalized during the Vietnam War era, however the unit did not serve overseas.

== Personal life ==
Miller has been married to Caroline (Harrison Tucker) Miller for more than 40 years. They have two children: Sam and Amanda.

== Professional Background ==
During his career Miller has been:

- An accredited correspondent on Capitol Hill,
- A member of the White House Correspondents Association,
- A member of the National Press Club,
- A Washington editor with The Chilton Company, a major publisher of business magazines,
- A weekly columnist with The Washington Post.
- A nationally syndicated newspaper columnist distributed by Content That Works.

== Making Newsman's Privilege a National Right ==
Doctors, lawyers, and clerics all have a protected right to interact in private with patients, clients, and congregants. In "Newsman's Privilege: An Issue of Press Freedom,” Miller found that journalists often had little if any way to protect sources at the state level. The article called for the establishment of a federal newsman's privilege act that would protect reporters in all states. Miller's piece was published by The Quill (July 1971), the national magazine of Sigma Delta Chi, what is now known as the Society of Professional Journalists (SPJ). Also see Miller's Why a Media Shield Is Impossible from The Huffington Post, May 13, 2013:

== Who Uses the Freedom of Information Act (FOIA)? ==
Miller's early study of the Freedom of Information Act (FOIA) found that it helped journalists informally pressure federal agencies to provide information. However, some four years after the 1967 passage of the legislation, formal FOIA appeals by journalists were rare. Miller's study showed that of 133 formal FOIA requests just 12 came from the media while most came from private attorneys and business interests. From Freedom of Information Act: Boon or Bust for the Press?, Editor & Publisher, July 8, 1972.

== Putting Real Estate Online ==
Miller was the original creator and host of the Real Estate Desk at America Online, one of the Internet's earliest and largest real estate hubs. "For the most part," reported Inman News in 1996, "he is credited with legitimizing the on-line real estate world."

== Forecasting the Mortgage Meltdown ==
Miller was an early critic of the financial practices and products which lead to the mortgage meltdown. In a speech before the Association of Real Estate License Law Officials in Jacksonville on April 7, 2006, he told the nation's real estate regulators:

"If you look at the numbers you can see that for many buyers the pricing gamble has been a huge success during the past few years. Home values have risen substantially in most areas. The odds are overwhelming that if you bought in 2000 or before and sold in 2005 or thereabouts you made money. A lot of money.

"But looming in the background is the potential for financial disaster that will impact home values nationwide, spur foreclosure rates to new highs and devalue insurance funds, pension holdings and investor accounts. The value of your home, no matter how you financed, is at stake."

== Published books ==
Miller is the author of seven books published originally by Harper & Row, including one with a co-author.

- The Common-Sense Mortgage: How to Cut the Cost of Home Ownership by $100,000 or More
- Successful Real Estate Investing: A Practical Guide to Profits for the Small Investor
- The Common-Sense Guide to Successful Real Estate Negotiation: How Buyers, Sellers and Brokers Can Get Their Share–And More–At the Bargaining Table (written with attorney Douglas M. Bregman)
- Buy Your First Home Now
- How to Sell Your Home in Any Market — With or Without a Broker
- Inside The Real Estate Deal
- Media Marketing: How to Get Your Name & Story in Print & on the Air
