= CRTS =

CRTS may refer to:

- The economic concept of Returns to scale
- Canadian Reformed Theological Seminary
- Catalina Real-time Transient Survey, a sky survey
- Certified Relocation and Transition Specialist
