= Pocket listing =

Real estate sold through private connections

In the real estate industry in the United States, a pocket listing or hip pocket listing is a property where a broker sells a property through private connections rather than entering it into a multiple listing system (MLS) or otherwise publicly advertising it. In Canada, this is called an exclusive listing.

== Background ==
The reasons for a pocket listing may vary from the need for privacy or secrecy to discrimination, and some sellers may have their own reasons for not advertising a listing in conventional ways, including wanting to sell only to certain types of people. Several legitimate marketing strategies can also lead sellers to choose pocket listings. Pocket listings can be very appealing to buyers who seek exclusive opportunities. Other legitimate reasons for a seller to decide to do a pocket listing include the potential for a faster, smoother transaction when the listing agent has buyer clients who may be interested in the property. It can reduce the need for many showings to strangers. A pocket listing can help reduce the likelihood of a stale listing that can be caused by a property sitting on the MLS for many weeks or months.

Many full-time agents have knowledge of pocket listings in their own office or in other offices of their own company. While many MLS systems may try to limit this type of listing by requiring execution of a written notice relative to the benefits of MLS publicity, they may encourage members to refrain from taking pocket listings. There are some companies which list property as pocket listings for a short time before entering it into their MLS. With the written agreement of the seller, this would allow the company to try to obtain both the listing side and the "selling" side of the commission, an industry term known as "both sides of the transaction".

A real estate company which is not a member of any MLS may have pocket listings, but may still be willing to cooperate with other real estate professionals in the sale of their listings.

A broker or agent having a Pocket Listing can sometimes imply that the property will be sold directly to a buyer by the seller's agent.

Some brokerages are starting to provide private pocket listing services for the public and investors that allow them to act as a dual-agent in the transaction.

== Price ranges ==
Pocket listings may be used for properties of any price. Pocket listings are not restricted to the most exclusive high-end homes.

== Comparison with open listings ==
Pocket listings are not "Open Listings". An open listing is an Agreement between a seller and a broker whereby the property is available for sale by any real estate professional who can advertise, show, or negotiate the sale, and whoever brings an acceptable offer would receive compensation.

Real estate companies will typically require that a written agreement for an open listing be signed by the seller to ensure the payment of a commission. "For Sale By Owners" (FSBOs) often also offer open listings by signing an agreement to pay a broker who brings them an acceptable offer, but these will usually not be pocket listings.

== Comparison with Exclusive Right to Sell ==
In an "Exclusive Right to Sell Agreement", the broker normally agrees to cooperate with other brokers and to share a portion of the total real estate commission paid by the seller. However, in a pocket listing situation, it is stated that the property shall not be placed in an MLS, and thus there is no agreement to work cooperatively with other brokers.

An alternative form of Agreement might be "Exclusive Agency" where only the broker is given the right to sell the property, and no offer of compensation is ever made to another broker. In that case, the property will never be entered into an MLS.

== See also ==
- Types of listing contracts
- List of real estate topics
- Real estate trends
