= Federal Real Estate Board =

The Federal Real Estate Board was a United States federal agency established in 1921 within the Treasury Department to manage federal properties (excluding public lands such as National Forests and Bureau of Land Management land), with its purpose being to reduce expenses by coordinating the use of real estate across federal agencies. It was active in the Harding and Coolidge administrations.

A different board of the same name was active during the Roosevelt and Truman administrations. This time, the board was primarily tasked to study the impact on state and local governments of the loss of tax revenue due to the exemption from taxation of the vast federal real estate holdings. It also sought to mitigate such damages by encouraging the sale of surplus property and minimizing the acquisition of additional property.

Today federal buildings, among other resources, are managed by the General Services Administration.

== First Federal Real Estate Board (1922) ==
An executive order by President Warren Harding on November 8, 1921, called for the creation of various boards "to promote economy and efficiency in the routine business and administration of the Government", and "in the application of uniform business principles and methods to the expenditure of public funds". Under this order, the Federal Real Estate Board was created on February 18, 1922, to "coordinate the activities of the Government relative to the purchase, sale, and rental of real property". It first met on April 14 of that year.

The creation of the board was lauded by the National Association of Real Estate Boards, who had been advocating for improvements in the government's methods of managing federal real estate. The association said creation of the board "meets with the hearty approval of Realtors"; it tendered its service to the government to aid in the acquisition, leasing, and disposition of property for the government.

The board was led by the Surveyor General of Real Estate and included a representative of every federal department that owned, occupied, or otherwise controlled federal real estate. In its first year, the board effected the location of federal agencies into government-owned buildings in some large cities and planned to meet future growth by using surplus property before making new acquisitions. The board was focused on addressing a problem caused by the lack of coordination of real estate needs across different departments and agencies. It approved over 1000 property leases and the sale of several properties.

In 1922, the board created a standard lease to be used by the Federal Government. The board asked the National Association of Real Estate Boards to review the lease, to insure it was "uniformly just to the owner and to the government".

=== Reports ===
A June 30, 1923, report by the board chairman reported that the board had already found underutilized real estate due to there having been no prior coordination between departments and agencies. It recommended that the board undertake a forecast of all real estate needs for a ten-year period, and specify standardized space requirements for administrative functions. It reported that the board had approved over 2500 leases, approved the sale of 100 properties, and approved the purchase of 24 others. It also determined that the value of federal property was $1,179,778,031 not including public lands.

By June 30, 1924, the total value of property was $1,542,655,511 and the board had completed compiling the records on all property. In the prior year, over 2000 leases were approved; the board noted that lease amounts—rent paid by the government—on a number of post offices were increasing. The board coordinated the transfer of military property no longer needed by the Department of War to other departments; it also coordinated the sale of any such property. The 1924 report also noted that the War Department, Navy Department, Veterans' Bureau, Interstate Commerce Commission, and the Post Office already had well-functioning central departments of real estate that could provide the board with information on their properties; the report urged other departments to create such units.

The board's 1925 annual report was similar, noting the approval of over 3,200 leases, rising rents, and approval of 23 purchases and 81 sales, mostly for the military. It noted the transfer of part of Ft. Leavenworth from the War Department to the Department of Justice, and the sale of 23 military reservations in Alaska.

The 1926 report continued detailing the leases approved, as well as property bought and sold. It announced new policies in an attempt to save more money: the board would not approve new leases if there was suitable space available in an existing building; if there was any question about suitability, the burden to prove the space was not suitable was with the agency requesting new space; the board's second new policy was that 100 square feet of space for an official, and 60 square feet for subordinates was sufficient.

The board's 1927 report, in addition to documenting leases and summarizing rent increases, noted the transfer of the Big Pine Day School in Inyo County, California from the Department of Interior to the Department of Agriculture. It also announced even tighter procedures to be followed to request additional space, with the aim of further savings in rent paid by the Federal Government.

=== Membership ===
The chairman for many years was James A. Wetmore. Representation on the board was as follows:

- The vice-chairman and secretary represented the War and Navy Departments, the largest owners of federal properties.
- The other members of the board represented the following federal departments:
  - Department of Agriculture
  - Department of Commerce
  - Department of the Interior
  - Department of Justice
  - Department of Labor
  - Department of State
  - Treasury Department
  - Federal Trade Commission
  - Government Printing Office
  - Interstate Commerce Commission
  - Library of Congress
  - United States Office of Public Buildings and Grounds
  - Housing Corporation
  - United States Railroad Administration
  - United States Veterans' Bureau
  - United States Shipping Board

== Second Federal Real Estate Board (1939) ==
The second board was established by Executive Order 8304 of January 14, 1939, and abolished by Executive Order 10287 of September 6, 1951.

=== Background ===
On December 17, 1935, during a meeting of the National Emergency Council, President Franklin Roosevelt ordered a study on the effect of the ownership of real estate by the United States on the real estate tax revenue of state and local government. The study was to be performed by a committee comprising the Secretary of the Treasury, the Attorney General, and the Director of the Bureau of the Budget.

The committee considered the loss of tax revenue to state and local governments to be a serious problem due to the large amount of federally-owned property exempt from taxation. It made no recommendations on compensation for loss of tax revenue on federal property and limited its function to assessing the amount and value of federal property and the resulting lost tax revenue of the property.

The study, completed in 1939, made several recommendations:

- All federal agencies should analyze the real estate under their control and identify any surplus property that could be sold or put to another use.
- All records of all real estate should be maintained by the Procurement Division of the Treasury Department.
- A Federal Real Estate Board should be established with three main objectives:
  - Make recommendations about areas (state, county, local) with significant loss of tax revenue due to substantial amounts of federally-owned (non-taxed) land.
  - Review proposed real estate acquisitions.
  - Make recommendations regarding the sale of surplus real estate.

Roosevelt created the board by executive order. The board was to consist of a representative of every government agency "in charge of considerable holdings of Federal income-producing property", as well as representatives from the Procurement Division and the Bureau of the Budget.

=== 1943 Report ===
The board issued a report entitled "Federal Contributions to State and Local Governmental Units with Respect to Federally Owned Real Estate".

In this report, the board considered compensating for loss of property tax revenue on federal property, and concluded the simplest solution would be to let the property be taxed the same as privately owned property. But it rejected this as inequitable because federal property often provided local community benefits that private property did not. It felt instead that compensatory federal payments in lieu of taxes for certain classes of property would be equitable.

The board said that property that provided general government administration and local services, such as office buildings, post offices, courthouses, customs offices, and mints should be exempt from taxation or compensation. Also exempt were properties used for the care of people, such as quarantine stations, narcotics farms, immigration stations, reformatories, hospitals, and cemeteries.

With regard to property used for national defense, the board said compensation should be made for properties acquired after September 8, 1939.

=== Truman administration ===
On July 5, 1949, President Harry Truman vetoed Senate Bill 41, which would have paid the city of Reno, Nevada, $1,620 for street improvements made near a property owned by the United States Forest Service. Truman acknowledged that some jurisdictions suffered hardships due to loss of tax revenue on federally-owned property, but stated such property was exempt under the doctrine of intergovernmental immunity. Truman went on to say that special consideration for Reno would encourage further such requests; a general program addressing all federally-owned property, as recommended by the board in 1943, should be pursued by Congress instead.

Truman abolished the board by Executive Order 10287 of September 6, 1951.

=== Membership ===
The board included representatives of:

- Federal Works Agency (Public Buildings Administration)
- Bureau of the Budget
- Department of the Treasury
- War Department
- Department of Justice
- Department of the Navy
- Department of the Interior
- Department of Agriculture
- Department of Commerce
- United States Maritime Commission
- National Housing Agency
- Tennessee Valley Authority

== See also ==
- General Services Administration § Federal property and buildings
