= Real estate contract =

Type of contract

A real estate contract is a contract between parties for the purchase and sale, exchange, or other conveyance of real estate. The sale of land is governed by the laws and practices of the jurisdiction in which the land is located. Real estate called leasehold estate is actually a rental of real property such as an apartment, and leases (rental contracts) cover such rentals since they typically do not result in recordable deeds. Freehold ("More permanent") conveyances of real estate are covered by real estate contracts, including conveying fee simple title, life estates, remainder estates, and freehold easements. Real estate contracts are typically bilateral contracts (i.e., agreed to by two parties) and should have the legal requirements specified by contract law in general and should also be in writing to be enforceable.

== Details explained on the contract ==
=== In writing ===
It is a legal requirement in all jurisdictions that contracts for the sale of land be in writing to be enforceable. The various Statute of frauds require contracts for the sale of land to be in writing. In South Africa, the Alienation of Land Act specifies that any agreement of sale of immovable property must be in writing. In Italy, each transfer of real estate must be registered in front of a notary public in writing.

The common practice is for an "exchange of contracts" to take place. This involves two copies of the contract of sale being signed, one copy of which is retained by each party. When the parties are together, both would usually sign both copies, one copy of which would be retained by each party, sometimes with a formal handing over of a copy from one party to the other. However, it is usually sufficient that only the copy retained by each party be signed by the other party only. This rule enables contracts to be "exchanged" by mail. Both copies of the contract of sale become binding only after each party is in possession of a copy of the contract signed by the other party—i.e., the exchange is said to be "complete". An exchange by electronic means is generally insufficient for an exchange, unless the laws of the jurisdiction expressly validate such signatures.

A contract for the sale of land must:

- Identify the parties: The full name of the parties must be on the contract. In a sales contract, the parties are the seller(s) and buyer(s) of the real estate, who are often called the principals to distinguish them from real estate agents, who are effectively their intermediaries and representatives in negotiation of the price. If there are any real estate agents brokering the sale, they are typically listed also as the real estate brokers/agents who would earn the commission from the sale.
- Identify the real estate (property): At least the address, but preferably the legal description must be on the contract.
- Identify the purchase price: The amount of the sales price or a reasonably ascertainable figure (an appraisal to be completed at a future date) must be on the contract.
- Include signatures: A real estate contract must be entered into voluntarily (not by force), and must be signed by the parties.
- Have a legal purpose: The contract is void if it calls for illegal action.
- Involve Competent parties: Mentally impaired, drugged persons, etc. cannot enter into a contract. Contracts in which at least one of the parties is a minor are voidable by the minor.
- Reflect a meeting of the minds: Each side must be clear and agree as to the essential details, rights, and obligations of the contract.
- Include Consideration: Consideration is something of value bargained for in exchange of the real estate. Money is the most common form of consideration, but other consideration of value, such as other property in exchange, or a promise to perform (i.e. a promise to pay) is also satisfactory.

Notarization by a notary public is normally not required for a real estate contract, but many recording offices require that a seller's or conveyor's signature on a deed be notarized to record the deed. The real estate contract is typically not recorded with the government, although statements or declarations of the price paid are commonly required to be submitted to the recorder's office.

Sometimes real estate contracts will provide for a lawyer review period of several days after the signing by the parties to check the provisions of the contract and counterpropose any that are unsuitable.

If there are any real estate brokers/agents brokering the sale, the buyer's agent will often fill in the blanks on a standard contract form for the buyer(s) and seller(s) to sign. The broker commonly gets such contract forms from a real estate association he/she belongs to. When both buyer and seller have agreed to the contract by signing it, the broker provides copies of the signed contract to the buyer and seller.

=== Offer and acceptance ===
As may be the case with other contracts, real estate contracts may be formed by one party making an offer and another party accepting the offer. To be enforceable, the offers and acceptances must be in writing (Statute of Frauds, Common Law)and signed by the parties agreeing to the contract. Often, the party making the offer prepares a written real estate contract, signs it, and transmits it to the other party who would accept the offer by signing the contract. As with all other types of legal offers, the other party may accept the offer, reject it (in which case the offer is terminated), make a counteroffer (in which case the original offer is terminated), or not respond to the offer (in which case the offer terminates by the expiration date in it). Before the offer (or counteroffer) is accepted, the offering (or countering) party can withdraw it. A counteroffer may be countered with yet another offer, and a counteroffering process may go on indefinitely between the parties.

To be enforceable, a real estate contract must possess original signatures by the parties and any alterations to the contract must be initialed by all the parties involved. If the original offer is marked up and initialed by the party receiving it, then signed, this is not an offer and acceptance but a counter-offer.

=== Deed specified ===
A real estate contract typically does not convey or transfer ownership of real estate by itself. A different document called a deed is used to convey real estate. In a real estate contract, the type of deed to be used to convey the real estate may be specified, such as a warranty deed or a quitclaim deed. If a deed type is not specifically mentioned, "marketable title" may be specified, implying a warranty deed should be provided. Lenders will insist on a warranty deed. Any liens or other encumbrances on the title to the real estate should be mentioned up front in the real estate contract, so the presence of these deficiencies would not be a reason for voiding the contract at or before the closing. If the liens are not cleared before by the time of the closing, then the deed should specifically have an exception(s) listed for the lien(s) not cleared.

The buyer(s) signing the real estate contract are liable (legally responsible) for providing the promised consideration for the real estate, which is typically money in the amount of the purchase price. However, the details about the type of ownership may not be specified in the contract. Sometimes, signing buyer(s) may direct a lawyer preparing the deed separately what type of ownership to list on the deed and may decide to add a joint owner(s), such as a spouse, to the deed. For example, types of joint ownership (title) may include tenancy in common, joint tenancy with right of survivorship, or joint tenancy by the entireties. Another possibility is ownership in trust instead of direct ownership.

=== Contingencies ===
Contingencies are conditions which must be met if a contract is to be performed.

Contingencies that suspend the contract until certain events occur are known as "suspensive conditions". Contingencies that cancel the contract if certain event occur are known as "resolutive conditions".

Most contracts of sale contain contingencies of some kind or another, because few people can afford to enter into a real estate purchase without them. But it is possible for a real estate contract not to have any contingencies.

Some types of contingencies which can appear in a real estate contract include:

- Mortgage contingency – Performance of the contract (purchase of the real estate) is contingent upon or subject to the buyer getting a mortgage loan for the purchase. Usually such a contingency calls for a buyer to apply for a loan within a certain period of time after the contract is signed. Since most people who buy a house require financing to complete their purchase, mortgage contingencies are one of the most common type of contingencies in real property contracts. If the financing is not secured, the buyer may unilaterally cancel the contract by stating that his or her condition has not or will not be satisfied or allow the contract to expire by declining to waive the condition within the specified time period.
- Inspection contingency – Another buyer's condition. Purchase of the real estate is contingent upon a satisfactory inspection of the real property revealing no significant defects. Contingencies could also be made on the satisfactory repair of a certain item associated with the real estate.
- Another sale contingency – Purchase or sale of the real estate is contingent on a successful sale or purchase of another piece of real estate. The successful sale of another house may be needed to finance the purchase of a new one.
- Appraisal contingency – Purchase of the real estate is contingent upon the contract price being at or below a fair market value determined by an appraisal. Lenders will often not lend more than a certain percentage (fraction) of the appraised value, so such a contingency may be useful for a buyer.
- 72-hour kick out contingency - Seller contingency, in which the seller accepts a contract from a buyer with a contingency (typically a home sale or rent contingency where the buyer conditions the sale on their ability to find a buyer or renter for their current property prior to settlement). The seller retains the right to sell the property to another party if he so chooses after giving the buyer 72 hours notice to remove their contingency. The buyer will then either remove their contingency and provide proof that they can consummate the sale or will release the seller from their contract and allow the seller to move forward with the new contract.

=== Date of closing and possession ===
A typical real estate contract specifies a date by which the closing must occur. The closing is the event in which the money (or other consideration) for the real estate is paid for and title (ownership) of the real estate is conveyed from the seller(s) to the buyer(s). The conveyance is done by the seller(s) signing a deed for buyer(s) or their attorneys or other agents to record the transfer of ownership. Often other paperwork is necessary at the closing.

The date of the closing is normally also the date when possession of the real estate is transferred from the seller(s) to the buyer(s). However, the real estate contract can specify a different date when possession changes hands. Transfer of possession of a house, condominium, or building is usually accomplished by handing over the key(s) to it. The contract may have provisions in case the seller(s) hold over possession beyond the agreed date.

The contract can also specify which party pays for what closing cost(s). If the contract does not specify, then there are certain customary defaults depending on law, common law (judicial precedents), location, and other orders or agreements, regarding who pays for which closing costs.

=== Condition of property ===
A real estate contract may specify in what condition of the property should be when conveying the title or transferring possession. For example, the contract may say that the property is sold as is, especially if demolition is intended. Alternatively there may be a representation or a warranty (guarantee) regarding the condition of the house, building, or some part of it such as affixed appliances, HVAC system, etc. Sometimes a separate disclosure form specified by a government entity is also used. The contract could also specify any personal property (non-real property) items which are to be included with the deal, such as washer and dryer which are normally detachable from the house. Utility meters, electrical wiring systems, fuse or circuit breaker boxes, plumbing, furnaces, water heaters, sinks, toilets, bathtubs, and most central air conditioning systems are normally considered to be attached to a house or building and would normally be included with the real property by default.

=== Riders ===
Riders (or addenda) are special attachments (separate sheets) that become part of the contract in certain situations.

=== Earnest money deposit ===
Although money is the most common consideration, it is not a required element to have a valid real estate contract. An earnest money deposit from the buyer(s) customarily accompanies an offer to buy real estate and the deposit is held by a third party, like a title company, attorney or sometimes the seller. The amount, a small fraction of the total price, is listed in the contract, with the remainder of the cost to be paid at the closing. In some rare cases, other instruments of value, like notes and/or stock or other negotiable instruments can be used for consideration. Other hard assets, like gold, silver and anything of value can also be used or in other cases, love (where it can be shown to have existed between the parties). However, the earnest money deposit represents a credit towards the final sales price, which is usually the main or only consideration. In commercial acquisitions, the deposit is often held in escrow throughout a due diligence period that may be around 45 days, during which the buyer's capital remains tied up while financing or equity commitments are still being finalized.

== Financial qualifications of buyer(s) ==
The better the financial qualification of the buyer(s) is, the more likely the closing will be successfully completed, which is typically the goal of the seller. Any documentation demonstrating financial qualifications of the buyer(s), such as mortgage loan pre-approval or pre-qualification, may accompany a real estate offer to buy along with an earnest money check. When there are competing offers or when a lower offer is presented, the seller may be more likely to accept an offer from a buyer demonstrating evidence of being well qualified than from a buyer without such evidence. Research indicates that a substantial majority of sellers prefer offers from pre-approved buyers; according to Zillow's Consumer Housing Trends Report 2022, 85% of sellers reported a preference for pre-approved buyers over those without verified financing documentation.

== See also ==
- Real estate settlement company
- Real estate transaction
- Land contract - a special form of real estate contract where the seller provides financing for the buyer to repay in installments
