= Habitability =

Adequacy of an environment for a human being

Habitability is the adequacy of an environment for human living. Where housing is concerned, there are generally local ordinances which define habitability. If a residence complies with those laws, it is said to be habitable. In extreme environments, such as space exploration, habitability must take into account psychological and social stressors, due to the harsh nature of the environment.

== Habitability in law ==
Habitability is the conformance of a residence or abode to the implied warranty of habitability. A residence that complies is said to be habitable. It is an implied warranty or contract, meaning it does not have to be an express contract, covenant, or provision of a contract. There was no implied warranty of habitability for tenants at common law and the legal doctrine has since developed in many jurisdictions through housing laws and regulations. Habitability is a common law doctrine that is largely synonymous with tenantability. In Architecture, the term habitability is understood to be an umbrella term for the suitability and value of a built habitat for its inhabitants in a specific environment over time.

In order to be habitable, such housing usually:

- must provide shelter, with working locks
- must be heated in the winter months (typically between October 1 and May 31 in the Northeastern United States)
- must not be infested with vermin, roaches, termites, or mold
- requires the landlord to stop other tenants from making too much noise (as measured by the decibel scale), second-hand smoke, or from selling narcotics
- must provide potable water
- each jurisdiction may have various rules.

=== Consequences ===
Violation of the warranty of habitability results in constructive eviction, whereby the landlord or lessor has, in effect, evicted the tenant or lessee. The tenant may remedy the problem, or complain to local government authorities for remedies.

=== See also ===
- Real property
- Real estate
- Implied warranty of habitability

== Habitability in extreme environments ==
Human factors and habitability are important topics for working and living spaces. For space exploration, they are vital for mission success. One of the critical characteristics for living and working in extreme environments the dependency on the habitat, its technological capability as well as the sociospatial framing. Inhabitants who are exposed to remote and hostile environments, not only must overcome the challenges posed by the dangers and limitations imposed by the particular environment itself, but also experience significant distress from being confined indoors and isolated from civilization and social contact.

Components of the system include: The setting, the individual, the group or (microsociety) and the time. Support and evidence for the need of integrating habitability can be found in every decade. Thomas M. Fraser suggested "that habitability can be considered as the equilibrium state, resulting from man-machine-environment-mission interactions which permits man to maintain physiological homeostasis, adequate performance, and psycho-social integrity".

== Habitability of islands ==
In 2020, on the island of Kökar in the Baltic Sea, Christian Pleijel, chairman of the Municipal Council, innovated a method to measure the degree of habitability on the island, to better understand its demographic challenges. Engaging half of the island's population to measure the habitability of their island, themselves, on their own terms, in a citizen science level 3 approach, the method showed important and unaddressed characteristics of a small island society. The work has been supported by Tonino Picula, chairman of SEArica at the European Parliament, and the Finnish Ministry of Economic Affairs end Employment has commissioned Åbo Akademi University to implement this tool among the 600 inhabited Finnish islands. Seventeen islands in Finland have now followed Kökar's example, four of them in Pargas. Four islands in Denmark and one in Croatia will follow in 2026.

== See also ==
- Space habitation
  - Lunar habitation
