= Commercial information exchange =

A commercial information exchange (CIE) is an Internet-based commercial property listing service in the United States that is operated by a local association to serve the local market.

A CIE is the commercial real estate equivalent of the residential Multiple Listing Service. CIEs help commercial real estate professionals (brokers, property owners, developers, investors, tenants, etc.) share information about commercial property, recent sale or lease transactions, market statistics, and contacts.

CIEs tend to exist in larger markets with a more developed, more organized commercial real estate industry. There are less than 100 CIEs in the United States.

CIEs vary in scope, serving cities, states, or larger regions. They also vary in function, depending on the depth and breadth of data in a particular market. For example, the Louisiana Commercial Database contains primarily commercial for sale or lease in the state of Louisiana while the Commercial Alliance of Las Vegas' CIE includes active listings, off-market properties, and completed transactions in the greater Las Vegas, Nevada area.

== Differences from residential multiple listing service ==
There are two key differences between a commercial information exchange and a multiple listing service. CIE participants need not have an exclusive right to sell or lease a property in order to list it on a CIE, and CIE listings need not include details on compensation for cooperating parties.
