= Bargain and sale deed =

In United States real property law, a bargain and sale deed is a deed "conveying real property without covenants".

This is a deed "for which the grantor implies to have or have had an interest in the property but offers no warranties of title to the grantee." Because it lacks any warranty, it is the least attractive kind of deed.

Under common law, this type of deed technically created a use in the buyer who then gets the title. Under the statute of uses, modern real property law disregards this subtle distinction.

A bargain and sale deed is especially used by local governments, fiduciaries such as executors, and in foreclosure sales by sheriffs and referees. The fact that it comes without any warranties from the government means that the new owner may not have a good title. If in fact, the city did not have a good title or the city could not convey a good title, then the new landowner is unlikely to be successful in obtaining a refund of the purchase price.

Some states require a specific form to be used. Some states also allow a grantor (or seller) to add warranties. In such case, it may be called a bargain and sale deed with covenants.

== See also ==
- Quitclaim deed
- Warranty deed
