= Listing contract =

Real estate contract

A listing contract (or listing agreement) is a contract between a real estate broker and an owner of real property granting the broker the authority to act as the owner's agent in the sale of the property.

If the broker is a member of the National Association of Realtors, the agreement must include all of the following terms:

1. A beginning date and a termination date.
2. The list price at which the property will be offered for sale.
3. The amount of compensation offered to the broker, whether it is in the form of a flat fee or percentage of the sales price.
4. The terms and conditions under which the brokerage fee shall be paid by the seller.
5. Authorizes the broker to co-operate with other brokers as sub-agents or buyer's agents, and details the compensation to be offered to those brokers in the event they procure a buyer.
6. Authorizes the broker to reveal or not to reveal the existence of offers previously received.

In addition, other terms which may appear in the agreement can include:

- Authorization to the broker to post a sign, to advertise the property, and to put a lockbox on the door, as well seller's obligations to advise the broker on the condition of the property, and broker's obligations to advise the seller about regulations and laws which may affect the sale.

Typically, separate listing agreements exist for the sale of residential property, for land, and for commercial or business property.

Upon listing the property, the real estate agency tries to obtain a buyer for the property and, in consideration of successfully finding a satisfactory buyer, the broker anticipates receiving a commission (fee) for the services the brokerage provided.

== Payment of a commission or fee ==
Although the terms of the contract could vary, usually the payment of a commission (or fee) to the brokerage is contingent upon:

- the successful negotiation of a purchase contract between a satisfactory buyer and seller and the subsequent ability and willingness of the buyer to close the deal, or
- finding a satisfactory buyer who is ready, willing, and able to pay the full listing price (or more) for the real estate for sale without any contingencies.

If the seller refuses to sell the real estate when one of the above two conditions applies, it is typically considered that the real estate agent has done their job of finding a satisfactory buyer and the seller must still pay the commission, although the details are determined by the listing contract. Unless closing (or "settlement" or "close of escrow", as it is known in some parts of the country) is a condition of the listing agreement, the buyer's failure to complete the transaction may not require the seller to pay a commission to the broker.

The commission is usually a percentage of the sales price of the property, ranging from 2 or 3% up to about 10%, but usually in the range of about 3 - 7% for houses. The commission could also be a flat fee or some combination of flat fee and percentage, based on the rate you negotiate. Commission rates and fees are negotiable and not regulated. The average days to sale in your market, advertising, labor costs, length of term, and competition may influence the rate acceptable by the listing real estate broker before entering a listing agreement.

The commission is paid by the seller to the listing real estate broker, who will then compensate their listing agent and any co-operating brokers/agents from this commission by separate agreements with them.

== Listing price and final contract price ==
The listing contract typically also includes a listing price for the property and a date of expiration by which the contract expires. However, if the property is sold at a lower or higher price, the seller pays a commission at a proportionally lower or higher amount. If the seller does not accept a price lower than the listing price, then the broker will have to wait until a satisfactory sale to earn the commission.

In the event of multiple offers being presented, the seller may accept whichever offer is most suitable to him/her, even if the price is not the highest. The percentage commission will be paid according to the accepted price. The seller, often in concurrence with the real estate agent, may choose to accept an offer that is lower than the highest offer for various reasons, such as terms or contingencies in the purchase contract offered or perceived differences in financial qualification of the competing buyers.

Typically, the real estate agent has the experience and data to determine a suitable listing price for the seller's property and will recommend a listing price to the seller. The seller can accept, reject, or try to negotiate a different listing price for the contract. If the seller's price is unrealistically high and the agent cannot convince the seller otherwise, the agent can decline to list the property.

== Expiration date ==
Listing a property commonly incurs certain expenses for the listing broker and takes some time and effort for the listing salesperson. To make it worthwhile, they want a certain minimum listing time period to have a good chance of selling the property. However, the listing contract must have an expiration date. A typical listing period is often three to six months. If the property is not sold or under a purchase contract by then, the seller may decide to re-list the property, perhaps with a different listing price, with the same or a different broker or agent, or not list it at all. The listing of the property can start at a date later than the date the listing contract is signed to allow the seller time to prepare the property for showing or sale.

== Types of listing contracts ==
There can be several types of listing contracts:

- Exclusive right to sell: The seller must pay the brokerage a commission if, by the expiration date in the listing contract, the real estate is sold, regardless of whether the buyer is obtained through the agency or not. Even if the seller finds the buyer him/herself, a commission is still owed to the brokerage. Furthermore, the seller cannot list the property with any other broker until the listing expires with the property unsold.

Brokers who are also Realtors are obliged to enter the property into the local MLS system and offer compensation to co-operating brokers.

- Exclusive Agency: The seller can only list the property with one brokerage until the listing contract expires with the property unsold. The seller must pay the broker a commission if the real estate is sold to a buyer obtained through that brokerage. By agreement, if the seller finds the buyer him/herself, the seller does not have to pay a commission. Since there will be no co-operating broker involved, the property will not be listed in the MLS.
- Open Agency: A seller can enter into an agreement to sell their property with more than one brokerage in open agency listings. The seller must pay a commission only to the brokerage which brings the buyer for the real estate. Typically, if the seller finds the buyer him/herself, the seller does not have to pay a commission.

== See also ==
- Real estate transaction
