= Propertymark =

Membership organisation for estate agents in the UK

Propertymark (formerly National Association of Estate Agents or NAEA) is a membership organisation for UK estate agents. It is based in and covers the UK, and is the UK's leading professional body for estate agents. Its members practise across all aspects of property in the UK, including residential and commercial sales and letting, property management, business transfer, auctioneering and land.

Founded in 1962 by estate agent and entrepreneur Raymond Andrews, the NAEA was established with the goal of upholding good practice and high professional standards in UK estate agency. This struck a chord with the industry at a time when there was little representation for estate agents and has allowed the Association to grow since.

== Propertymark ==
Propertymark launched in February 2017 combining

- Association of Residential Letting Agents (ARLA)
- National Association of Estate Agents (NAEA)
- National Association of Valuers and Auctioneers (NAVA)
- Institution of Commercial and Business Agents (ICBA)
- Association of Professional Inventory Providers (APIP)
- NFoPP Awarding Body

into a single brand in order to achieve a greater consumer awareness.

== Membership ==
Propertymark offers consumer protection through its Propertymark Protected agents. Propertymark's aims are that it shall:

- Promote unity and understanding among estate agents and protect the general public against fraud, misrepresentation and malpractice
- Safeguard its membership and the public against restrictive practices within the profession
- Encourage a high ethical standard of competitive practice combined with commercial experience
- Provide an organisation for land and estate agents and managers, surveyors, auctioneers and valuers for the protection of their collective interest
- Do such things as may be necessary or expedient to sustain or raise the status of land and estate agents and managers, surveyors, auctioneers and valuers, and particularly members of the association as such.

Propertymark's rules were adopted at the inaugural meeting of the association on 6 March 1962 and have subsequently been amended, most recently in 2019.

== Propertylive ==
In October 2008, NAEA Propertymark entered the UK property portal market by launching their own property listings website PropertyLive. However, in January 2013 it was announced that PropertyLive was to close.

== See also ==
- Estate agent
- List of real estate topics
