= Association of Real Estate License Law Officials =

The Association of Real Estate License Law Officials (ARELLO), founded in 1930 in Canada, supports regulatory agencies in the administration and enforcement of real estate license (or registration) laws in their respective jurisdictions.

Among its positions, the organization encourages licensure and education recognition between jurisdictions. In May 2007, the Ontario Real Estate Association cited adherence to ARELLO exam standards as one of its reasons for switching to closed-book examinations.

== History ==
- 1930 – founded as the National Association of License Law Officials (NALLO)
- 1965 – renamed National Association of Real Estate License Law Officials (NARELLO)
- 1993 – renamed Association of Real Estate License Law Officials (ARELLO)
