= PLVI =

Urban planning term

A peak land value intersection is the region within a settlement with the greatest land value and commerce.

== Location ==
As such, it is usually located in the central business district of a town or city, and has the greatest density of transport links such as roads and rail. Other hallmarks indicating a PLVI are tall buildings (in order to maximise the use of land) and a relatively great number of pedestrians.

== Economic basis ==
This model is the urban equivalent of von Thünen's rural land use model in that both are based upon locational rent. The main assumption is that in a free market the highest bidder will obtain the use of the land. The highest bidder is likely to be the one who can obtain the maximum profit from that site and so can pay the highest rent. Competition for land is keenest in the city centre.

The most expensive or 'prime' sites in most cities are in the CBD, mainly because of its accessibility and the shortage of space there. Shops, especially department stores, conduct their business using a relatively small amount of ground space, and due to their high rate of sales and turnover they can bid a high price for the land (for which they try to compensate by building upwards and by using the land intensively). The most valuable site within the CBD is called the peak Land value intersection or PLVI. Competing with retailers are offices, which also rely upon good transport systems and, traditionally, proximity to other commercial buildings (this concept does not have the same relevance in centrally planned economies).

One basis of this model is 'the more accessible the site, the higher its land value'. Rents will therefore be greater along main routes leading out of the city and along outer ring roads. Where two of these routes cross, there may be a secondary or subsidiary land value peak. Here the land use is likely to be a small suburban shopping parade or a small industrial estate.

== See also ==
- Urban planning
