= Right of redemption =

Right to reclaim foreclosed property

The right of redemption, in the law of real property, is the right of a debtor whose real property has been foreclosed upon and sold to reclaim that property if they are able to come up with the money to repay the amount of the debt.

Within the U.S., for home mortgage foreclosures, a homeowner may redeem the foreclosed property up to the time of the foreclosure sale, and in many states for a limited period of time after the sale, by paying off the mortgage balance and the costs incurred by the lender and any purchaser. Similar rights of redemption apply after foreclosures for unpaid property taxes.

== See also ==
- Equity of redemption
