= Mini dorm =

A mini dorm is a rental property, usually a privately owned single-family house located near a suburban college campus or beach area, occupied by several young adults, each paying separate rents. The house can be specially remodelled for the purpose, including the addition of extra bedrooms, and paving the lawn for additional parking. The term is derived from 'miniature dormitory', and is not a reference to the size of the individual living units.

== Controversy ==
While property owners adjacent to campuses often rent rooms to students, the modified mini-dorm homes have caused quality-of-life concerns for their neighbors, who fear the encroachment of frat house activity. Issues with parking and noise quickly arise.

== Regulation ==
The law attempts to balance the right of property owners to rent their housing, as well as the student housing shortage, with quality of life issues and property value issues raised by their neighbors. In March 2007, the San Diego City Council adopted a trial policy addressing the behavior of mini-dorm tenants, as well as a moratorium on further garage conversions into bedrooms.
