= Four unities =

The four unities is a concept in the common law of real property that describes conditions that must exist in order to create certain kinds of property interests. Specifically, these four unities must be met for two or more people to own property as joint tenants with legal right of survivorship, or for a married couple to own property as tenants by the entirety. Some jurisdictions may require additional unities.

== The four unities ==
The mnemonic PITT is used for the four unities here: Possession, Interest, Time, & Title.

Unity of time
Interest must be acquired by both tenants at the same time.

At common law, the "time" requirement could be satisfied only by using a "straw man" to create a joint tenancy. The party creating the joint tenancy would have to convey title to a straw man, who would then transfer title to the two parties as joint tenants.

Unity of title
The interests held by the co-owners must arise out of the same instrument (i.e., written contract, deed of conveyance or assignment, etc.).

Unity of interest
Both tenants must have the same interest in the property.

This means that the joint tenants must have the same type of interest. For example, if X and Y acquire a joint tenancy, both X and Y's interests must be in fee simple absolute. If, for example, X has a fee simple absolute and Y has a life estate, there is no unity of interest.

Unity of possession
Both tenants must have the right to possess the whole property.

This is a joint right: if they agree between themselves to possess different parts, that will not affect their joint right (as against a landlord or other third party) to possess the whole.

If any of the four unities is broken and it is not a joint tenancy, the ownership reverts to a tenancy in common.

The unique aspect of a joint tenancy is that as the joint tenancy owners die, their shares accrue to the surviving owner(s) so that, eventually, the entire share is held by one person. Realism and Formalism in the Severance of Joint Tenancies This is because, for the purpose of the property interest, joint owners are regarded as a single legal entity.

== A fifth unity ==
Unity of marriage
For a tenancy by the entirety this fifth unity must be present. In some jurisdictions, marriage combined with the preceding four unities creates a tenancy by the entirety. A tenancy by the entirety gives rise to certain legal rights, such as rights of survivors, when one spouse is deceased that interest automatically passes to the surviving spouse. Additionally, in many States, the creditor of only one of the spouses cannot take the property held as tenants by the entirety; both spouses must be indebted to the creditor.

== A sixth unity ==
Unity of unison
For the parties to unite, they must be in unison. This has been criticised by the Law Commission in their 283rd report, entitled 'Unity in Leaseholds'.
