= Lease-option =

Real estate contract

A lease option (more formally Lease With the Option to Purchase) is a type of contract used in both residential and commercial real estate. In a lease-option, a property owner and tenant agree that, at the end of a specified rental period for a given property, the renter has the option of purchasing the property.

A lease option is different from a lease purchase contract, in that a lease purchase binds both parties to the sale, whereas in a lease-option the buyer has the option but the seller does not.

== Residential example ==
The example below describes a typical lease-option for residential properties; commercial lease-options are typically more complicated.

The contract is typically between two parties: the tenant (also called the lessee or tenant-buyer), and the landlord (lessor), who owns or has the right to lease or dispose of the property.

In order to have a valid option the tenant-buyer must in most cases provide "valuable consideration" (a fee) for the option. Generally, sellers will ask for as much as possible—often around 3–5% of the purchase price. The tenant-buyer usually will want to provide as little as possible—even a token amount of $100 represents "consideration." The option gives the tenant the right (but not the obligation) to purchase the property at a later date. The lease option only binds the seller to sell, it does not bind the buyer to buy. That makes it a "unilateral" or one-way agreement. In contrast, a lease-purchase is a bilateral, or two-way, agreement.

The basic elements of a lease-option are:

1. Buyer purchases the option. The parties agree to what the cost of the option is. As noted above, it can range from a token amount to 5% (or more) of the value of the property. The option fee usually is non-refundable. That is, if the tenant-buyer fails to exercise the option, the money remains with the seller. It is not refunded. The reason: The option fee is not a deposit. The option fee has been used to purchase something of value: the option.

2. The parties agree to a purchase price. It can be decided that the price will be the appraised value at the time the option is exercised. Generally, however, the purchase price is agreed upon at the inception of the option.

3. The length in residential real estate is typically 1–3 years. However, it is often unwise for the tenant-buyer to agree to a short period of time (often 2 years or less). The tenant-buyer often is expecting that the property will appreciate in value, particularly if the agreed-upon purchase price is equal to or higher than the fair market value at the time of the inception of the option. Perhaps even more important, often the tenant-buyer has credit or other financial issues preventing him/her from immediately purchasing. The option period is used to strengthen the tenant-buyer's credit, amass rent credits, and position him/herself to purchase. That often can take several years.

4. How much the monthly lease payment is, whether any of the lease payment is to be credited towards the purchase price reducing the purchase amount. Often, the monthly lease payment is equal to or slightly above the fair market rent of the property. And while it's fully negotiable, a credit in the range of 15%-25% is often offered. So, for example, if fair market rent for that unit would be $1,000, the seller might charge $1,100 with $200 of that being credited toward the purchase price.

5. Whether the tenant-buyer will occupy the property or whether the tenant/buyer has the right to sub lease or the right to sell the option. In most cases, the tenant-buyer occupies the property. Sellers will generally seek to make that one of the terms of the agreement.

6. An investor may acquire a distressed property with a lease option and make improvements to the property. Then the investor can sell the option to a buyer that is willing to pay the new market value for a profit. It is a common financing technique with investors. However, it is riskier than other methods the investor could use for controlling the property. The risks include the seller's inability to transfer clear title when the investor seeks to exercise the option. In that case, the investor will have made improvements (sometimes substantial) to a property he/she doesn't own and may not be able to acquire. If the investor is considering anything more than cosmetic enhancements, he/she might consider another method of control such as a land trust or acquiring the property using what's called a "subject to" (or Sub 2) transaction.

6.a An example: Seller has a property that needs considerable amount of work. Retail buyers typically cannot get financing or have too much to choose from to bother with physically distressed properties. Investor enters into a lease option agreement for let's say $100,000, rehabs the property with about $20,000 and now the market value is approximately $135,000 the investor can sell the right to purchase for $35,000 and the new buyer would close with the original seller for $100,000

6.b Another example: A buyer buys the same property and uses his/her own money to rehab and may use rehab money towards the down payment. This allows the buyer to NOT have to come with a large down payment and rehab money.

Everything functions like a lease except there is a schedule when the buyer can decide to purchase the property.

The terms of the lease have to be negotiated also. These include items typically found in leases: maintenance, utilities, taxes, pets, how many occupants, insurance, ability to make modifications to the property, and so on. One note: Maintenance terms in a lease-option often differ from those in a standard lease. In a typical lease, often the owner is responsible for all repairs, except—sometimes—for a $50-$100 per incident deductible. Basically, the owner is responsible for virtually all repairs. In a lease-option, often a greater burden for repairs is shifted to the tenant-buyer.

During the term of the lease option, the tenant makes lease payments to the landlord for the use of the property with the terms mutually agreed. At the end of the contract, the tenant has the option to purchase the property outright. The tenant does so by going out and getting a mortgage.

Excess credit may also be applied towards the eventual purchase of the property, or towards the down payment for a mortgage (CAUTION, the buyer and seller can agree to whatever they want, but when the buyer goes to get permanent financing the bank has guidelines to what can be applied towards the down payment or the purchase. Typically banks only allow an amount that is above and beyond market rent to be considered for a down payment.) In that case, the lease-option works as an automatic savings plan for the tenant. This down payment is applied as part of the "option consideration fee"; in the arena of lease option purchasing this is a fee charged for the right to purchase the property.

== Reasons for using a lease option ==
Buyers

1. Buyer is relocating and may need to sell a property in another area before the buyer can qualify to purchase the new home.
2. Buyer may have had some credit issues that can be resolved during the option period.
3. Buyer may have started a new business and otherwise qualifies and can afford the payments.
4. Buyer may not have enough funds for a downpayment.
5. Buyer is relocating and is unfamiliar with the new area. He/she wants to "get a feel" for the area—safety, school quality, convenience, etc.
6. Buyer is seeking a VA loan and the property does not meet VA appraisal guidelines. Buyer agrees to make the needed repairs during the lease term to allow the property to meet these specifications.

In the event of non-payment, it may be possible for the seller to remove the tenants through eviction, which is likely to be cheaper than foreclosure on a mortgaged property. The lease-option may also require less money up front, while a mortgage might require a substantial down payment from the tenant.

If the tenant does not exercise the option to purchase the property by the end of the lease, then generally any up front option money along with any monies that the tenant paid in addition to the market rental rate for this option may be retained by the owner depending on the agreement. This might occur if the tenant no longer wishes to purchase the property, or if the tenant wishes to purchase the property but is unable to obtain the financing required to do so.

Seller

A lease-option allows the seller to sell a property that they may not have otherwise been able to sell. In many cases a seller can net more money when offering terms to a buyer. Sellers can often avoid paying a Realtor fee by using a lease-option agreement (as they have already found the buyer themselves).

There is an expression, “Price or terms, pick one;” sellers may be able to sell for a better price (or sell the property period) by offering attractive terms to the buyer(s). For the buyer to get a favorable price the terms usually have to favor the seller.

If the buyer defaults and the contracts are drafted properly then there is an automatic tenant landlord relationship. All valuable considerations are typically surrendered and then it would be an eviction.

Some forms of lease-option agreements have been criticized as predatory. For example, sometimes lease-options are offered to tenants who cannot realistically expect to ever exercise the option to purchase. Sometimes the lease-option period is for such a brief amount of time (6 months, for example) that the tenant-buyer has little chance to repair his/her credit, save money for a down payment, or address whatever other problems exist.

== See also ==
- Rent to own
- Lease purchase
- Rent with option to buy
