= National Association of Real Estate Brokers =

The National Association of Real Estate Brokers (NAREB) is a real estate trade organisation that was established on July 29, 1947. NAREB was created by African-American real estate professionals as an alternative space for African-Americans who were racially and specifically excluded from the National Association of Realtors.

NAREB members are called realtists (rather than realtors) and include all professional disciplines within the real estate industry including residential and commercial real estate agents and brokers, loan officers, mortgage brokers, title companies, appraisers, insurance agents and developers.

NAREB is headquartered in Lanham, Maryland.

== History ==
NAREB was founded by twelve individuals in Tampa, FL, one woman and eleven men from seven states across the United States. NAREB held its first convention at the Convention Hall in Atlantic City, N.J., between July 19–20, 1948.

Dr. Martin Luther King Jr. spoke at the NAREB National Mid-Winter Conference that was held in February 1968, in San Francisco, California, a few months before he was assassinated. During his speech, King talked about how a privately managed "Marshall Plan", similar to the one initiated in Europe following World War II, was needed to revitalize America's inner cities. King stated that in America's inner cities, a ten-billion dollar investment over ten years from the government would help attract or develop new businesses as well as maintain and improve existing businesses. In this revitalized urban economy, the employed inner city residents would become homeowners, he said, thus improving the social and economic climate of their communities.

== 2010s ==
In early August 2011, at its national convention in New Orleans, LA, NAREB announced an engagement with Wall Street investors to launch an $800 million Homeowner's Assurance Program (HAP) to address the effects of the housing mortgage crisis on African-Americans and other communities of color across the United States.

In March 2011, NAREB, along with two other organizations representing multicultural real estate professionals — the National Association of Hispanic Real Estate Professionals (NAHREP) and the Asian Real Estate Association of America (AREAA) — convened at the Multicultural Real Estate & Policy Conference in Washington, D.C., to discuss regulatory and policy changes to preserve access to homeownership for people of color. As a result of that meeting the organizations issued a joint report entitled "The Five Point Plan: Refocusing the Future of Minority Homeownership."

In 2010, NAREB announced the formation of two partnerships with organizations focused on addressing the needs of communities of people of color. In July, NAREB partnered with Integrated Mortgage Solutions (IMS), the only woman-owned collateral protection firm offering resources for the mortgage servicing sector. Additionally, NAREB announced its partnership with PartnerFirst, LLC, a provider of resources to mortgage services and outsourcers, creating a certified, nationwide, and multicultural short sale agent network to help communities of color across the United States avoid foreclosure.

In April 2015, Antoine M. Thompson became the National Executive Director of NAREB.

== Organization ==
NAREB's 2023-2025 leadership includes Dr. Courtney Johnson Rose, President; Ashley Thomas III, First Vice President; Danny Felton, Sr., Second Vice President; Courtney Jones, Third Vice President, Kathy Mann, Treasurer; Booker Pickett, Sr., Assistant Treasurer; Stacey Carter, Secretary; Ketrina Kier, Asst. Secretary, Felica Guidry, Chaplain, Monroe Wooten, Parliamentarian, and C. Renee Wilson, Executive Director.

Over its 69-year history, two women have led the organization as President: Evelyn A. Reeves and Maria Kong. In 2005, Catherine Dorsey was named co-chairman of the NAREB. She was the first woman named to the post. The current chairman and vice-chairman of the Board are Robert Hughes and Michelle Callaway, respectively.

NAREB, over the years, has operated mainly as a member-managed organization. However, in 2001, Lee Bowman became the official executive director of NAREB, ultimately, serving in the role of the organization's Executive Consultant, until 2004. He also had been the 2000 President and CEO of Lee Bowman & Associates, a Baltimore community development and finance consulting company. Prior to joining NAREB, Bowman served for six years as Mid-Atlantic Regional Director; Director of Housing and Community Development at Fannie Mae.

Brenda Brown became the first woman to serve as the Executive Consultant for NAREB. Previously, at the National Association of Realtors (NAR), Brown developed a comprehensive diversity program based on former U.S. President Bill Clinton's initiative on race called One America Initiative.

== Affiliates ==
NAREB's affiliates consist of the following:

- National Society of Real Estate Appraisers
- Commercial Industrial Division
- National Investment Division
- United Developers Council
- Real Estate Management Brokers Institute
- Young Realtists Division
- Sales Division
- Women's Council of NAREB
- Home Ownership Counselors
- Construction Division

== Women’s Council of NAREB ==
The Women's Council of NAREB, one of NAREB's ten affiliate organizations, is a nonprofit organization that focuses on community grassroots. Founded in Atlanta, Georgia, in 1971, officers and bylaws were established and Laura Seale became the first president of the Women's Council. It has over 18 chapters nationwide and women comprise 53 percent of the NAREB's membership, with participation in all divisions and aspects of the organization.
