= Plottage =

Increase in land value from combining adjacent parcels into a single larger parcel

Plottage is the increment of value realized when two or more adjacent parcels of land are combined into a single, larger parcel. The process of acquiring and combining the individual parcels is called assemblage. The core principle of plottage is that the unified parcel commands a value greater than the arithmetic sum of the individual parcels valued separately — a form of synergy applied to real property.

Plottage value arises because larger unified parcels enable development opportunities — higher-density construction, larger building footprints, or more economically viable project sizes — that are not available to the smaller individual lots. The concept is central to real estate appraisal, real estate development, and urban planning.

== Assemblage and plottage distinguished ==
The terms assemblage and plottage are related but technically distinct:

- Assemblage refers to the physical and legal process of acquiring multiple adjacent parcels and consolidating them under single ownership, typically through sequential purchases or negotiated multi-party transactions.
- Plottage refers to the value increment produced by that assemblage — the difference between the value of the unified parcel and the sum of the values of the component parcels.

In practice, the two terms are often used interchangeably in real estate markets, though appraisers maintain the distinction when quantifying land value in assemblage scenarios.

== Sources of plottage value ==
Plottage value derives from the expanded development potential of the combined parcel relative to the individual lots. The primary sources include:

=== Zoning and density ===
Many zoning ordinances impose minimum lot size requirements for certain uses or density levels. A single undersized parcel may be restricted to low-density residential use, while the combined parcel may qualify for higher-density residential, mixed-use, or commercial development. The ability to access a higher-value use drives the plottage premium.

=== Building footprint and configuration ===
Larger parcels permit larger building footprints, reducing the per-unit cost of foundations, structural systems, and building cores. Irregular or narrow individual parcels may be unbuildable or permit only inefficient structures; combined, they may yield a regularly shaped, fully buildable site.

=== Economies of scale in development ===
Development costs — site preparation, utilities, permits, professional fees — have significant fixed components that are spread over a larger revenue base when a larger project is built. The incremental cost per unit or per square foot declines as project size increases, improving pro forma returns and supporting a higher land price.

=== Street frontage and access ===
In commercial and retail contexts, parcels with greater street frontage command premiums because visibility and access are directly tied to sales volume. Assemblage of multiple parcels along a street frontage can unlock retail or commercial value unavailable to narrower individual lots.

== Plottage in real estate appraisal ==
Appraisers Encounter plottage value most frequently when valuing land for development, valuing assembled parcels relative to comparable unassembled land, or advising on the feasibility of an assemblage strategy.

=== Appraisal methods ===
The plottage increment is typically quantified by comparing:

1. The market value of the assembled parcel as a unified site, determined by reference to comparable sales of similarly sized and zoned land
2. The sum of the individual parcel values, determined by reference to comparable sales of smaller lots with similar characteristics

The difference is the plottage value:

$$\text{Plottage Value} = V_{\text{assembled}} - \sum_{i=1}^{n} V_i$$

where $V_{\text{assembled}}$ is the value of the unified parcel and $V_i$ is the individual appraised value of each component parcel.

=== Appraisal challenges ===
Quantifying plottage value is complicated by the holdout problem: in an assemblage, the last parcel owner to sell has negotiating leverage because the entire project depends on their cooperation. This can result in the final parcel selling at a significant premium to market value, making it difficult to establish the plottage increment from transaction data alone. Appraisers must account for this dynamic when estimating assemblage value for buyers and sellers.

== The holdout problem ==
A central challenge in assemblage transactions is the holdout problem — the strategic behavior of a parcel owner who recognizes that their cooperation is necessary to complete the assemblage and demands a price above the parcel's standalone market value in exchange. As an assembler acquires more of the required parcels, the remaining parcel owners gain increasing leverage, since the assembler's sunk costs and project timeline create pressure to close.

Holdout behavior can cause assemblage projects to fail entirely or to be completed only at costs that eliminate the plottage premium. Strategies used by developers to mitigate holdout risk include:

- Acquiring parcels through intermediaries or straw purchasers to conceal the scope of the assemblage
- Securing purchase options on all parcels simultaneously before any are exercised
- Structuring contingent purchase agreements across all required parcels
- Engaging in eminent domain-adjacent strategies where municipal urban renewal powers may be available

== Plottage in urban development ==
Assemblage and plottage are driving forces in urban infill development and urban renewal. In dense urban environments, individual lots are often too small for economically viable new construction at market densities. Developers aggregate multiple lots to create sites sufficient for mid-rise or high-rise development.

Notable large-scale assemblage activity has shaped development in cities including New York City, where supertall residential and commercial towers require the assembly of multiple mid-block lots, and Chicago, Los Angeles, and Houston, where commercial corridor assemblage is common.

Municipal governments may facilitate assemblage through redevelopment agencies, tax increment financing (TIF) districts, or eminent domain proceedings that assemble fragmented ownership for public or public-private development projects.

== Negative plottage ==
In some cases, combining parcels produces a value lower than the sum of the individual parcels — a condition sometimes called negative plottage or plottage in reverse. This can occur when:

- The combined parcel crosses a zoning district boundary, subjecting the whole to more restrictive regulations
- The assemblage eliminates a corner lot premium enjoyed by one of the component parcels
- The larger parcel is subject to additional regulatory requirements — such as environmental review or infrastructure contribution obligations — not applicable to smaller lots

== See also ==
- Land lot
- Real estate appraisal
- Real estate development
- Zoning
- Eminent domain
- Urban renewal
- Infill development
- Land value
