= Jurat (clause) =

Type of clause of an affidavit

A jurat (short for Latin juratum (est), "it has been sworn", 3rd singular perfect passive of jurare, "to swear") is a clause at the foot of an affidavit showing when, where, and before whom the actual oath was sworn or affirmation was made.

== English and American law ==
In English and American law, a jurat is that part of an affidavit which contains the names of the parties swearing the affidavit, the actual statement that an oath or affirmation has been made, the person before whom it was sworn, the date, place and other necessary particulars. The jurat is usually located on the bottom of a document. A typical form would be Sworn to before me this __ day of __ (month), 20__, with the signature of the witness, often a notary public, the venue, and sometimes other particulars. Old forms of jurats ran as Juratum... die... coram..., which then gave in English Sworn... this day... in front of....

Additionally, this term can be used for certain electronic forms, such as electronically filed tax returns in certain states, where the taxpayer(s) attest to the truth of the information contained. In the case of an electronically filed tax return, the taxpayer has to provide certain specific information—a social security number for example—to "sign" the jurat. Having done this, the electronically submitted return is considered to have the same legal effect as if the taxpayer had actually and physically signed the return.
