= Earnest payment =

Kind of commitment fee

An earnest payment or earnest money, also known as EMD is a specific form of security deposit made in some major transactions such as real estate dealings or required by some official procurement processes to demonstrate that the applicant is serious and willing to demonstrate an earnest of good faith about wanting to complete the transaction.

In the Middle Ages, the earnest payment was called variously an earnest penny, Arles penny, or God's silver (in Latin Argentum Dei). It was either money or a valuable coin or token given to bind a bargain, notably for the purchase or hiring of a servant. According to Black's Law Dictionary (sixth ed.), Et cepit de praedicto Henrico tres denarios de Argento Dei prae manibus ("And he took it from the aforesaid Henry [sealed by a] silver three pence [piece] handed over [in the sight of] God").

A potential buyer of property of high value such as residential real estate generally signs a contract and pays a sum acceptable to the seller by way of earnest money. The amount varies enormously, depending upon local custom and the state of the local market at the time of contract negotiations.

In the United States, earnest money deposits typically range from 1% to 3% of the agreed purchase price, though in highly competitive markets the amount may be negotiated higher to strengthen the buyer's offer. In one 2024 transaction involving a New York-based buyer, a $1.25 million deposit, equal to 5% of a $25 million purchase price, was used to secure a property during due diligence. The deposit is generally protected by contingency clauses written into the purchase agreement, such as financing, inspection, or appraisal contingencies, which allow the buyer to recover the deposit if a specified condition is not met. If the buyer withdraws from the transaction without invoking a valid contingency, the seller is typically entitled to retain the earnest money as liquidated damages for the breach of contract.

If the seller accepts the offer, the earnest money is held in trust or escrow. These funds may be held directly by the seller's attorney, the real estate broker (as in the State of New York) or by a settlement or title company (as in states like California, New Jersey, Florida, and Texas).

When the transaction is settled then the deposit is applied to the buyer's portion of the remaining costs. If the offer is rejected, the earnest money is usually returned, since no binding contract has been entered into.

== See also ==
- King's shilling
- List of real estate topics
- Contingency (real estate)
- Escrow
