= Quitclaim =

Renunciation or transfer of land rights

Generally, a quitclaim is a formal renunciation of a legal claim against some other person, or of a right to land. A person who quitclaims renounces or relinquishes a claim to some legal right, or transfers a legal interest in land. Originally a common-law concept dating back to Medieval England, the expression is in modern times mostly restricted to North American law, where it often refers specifically to a transfer of ownership or some other interest in real property.

Commonly, quitclaims are used in situations where a grantor transfers any interest they have in property to a recipient (the grantee) but without offering any guarantee as to the extent of that interest. There may even be no guarantee that the grantor owns the property or has any legal interest in it whatsoever. Specific situations where a precise definition of the grantor's interest (if any) may be unnecessary include property transferred as a gift, to a family member, or into a business entity. Another typical use is where there was a previous assignment that is under some question, and a subsequent assignment "quitclaims" the same property to the same grantee, on terms that perfect the possible defect (without conceding that the defect exists, and with no warranty that the grantor has any residual interest to transfer).

The legal instrument by which the transfer is effected may be known as a quitclaim deed or a quitclaim agreement. Details of the instrument itself, and the typical circumstances of use, vary by U.S. state.

== History ==
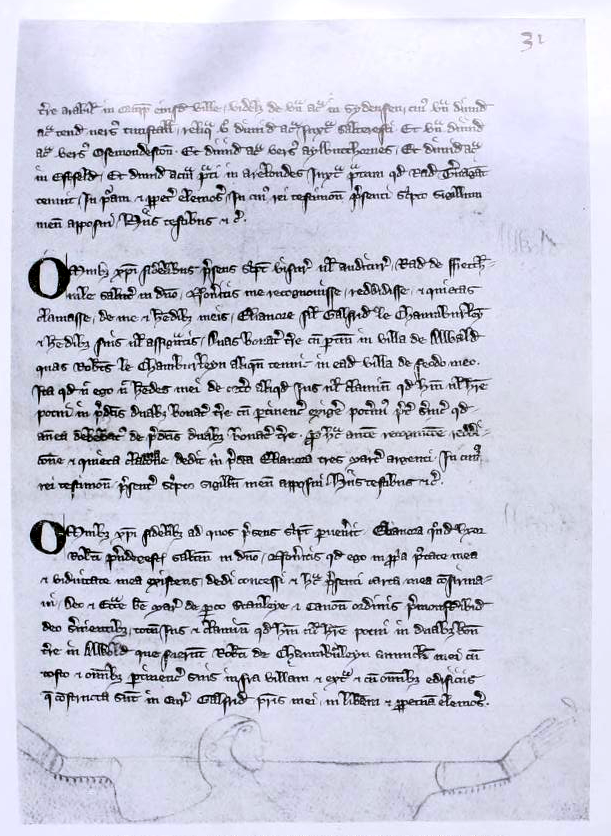
Cartulary of Dale Abbey, Derbyshire, folio 36. In the middle section Ralph de Frescheville quitclaims two bovates of land to Eleanor, daughter of Geoffrey Chamberlain, for three marks in silver. No date, but folio 37 records a deed of 1261

The common law concept of quitclaim dates back to medieval England. Its purpose was to provide a straightforward way for a tenant or other person in actual possession of some land to acquire additional rights in it from some other person. For example, a tenant in possession might acquire a fee simple in the land from a superior landowner such as a freeholder. In such a case, the use of quitclaim circumvented the multistep process of the tenant having to formally give up possession to the original freeholder, merely in order to be re-granted possession by feoffment as freeholder in their own right.

Quitclaim may originally have been an oral transaction, but by the thirteenth century a formal sealed document or court record had become necessary. A famous early example is the Quitclaim of Canterbury of 1189, by which Richard I reversed the Treaty of Falaise, transferring his claims on Scotland to William the Lion.

== In United States law ==
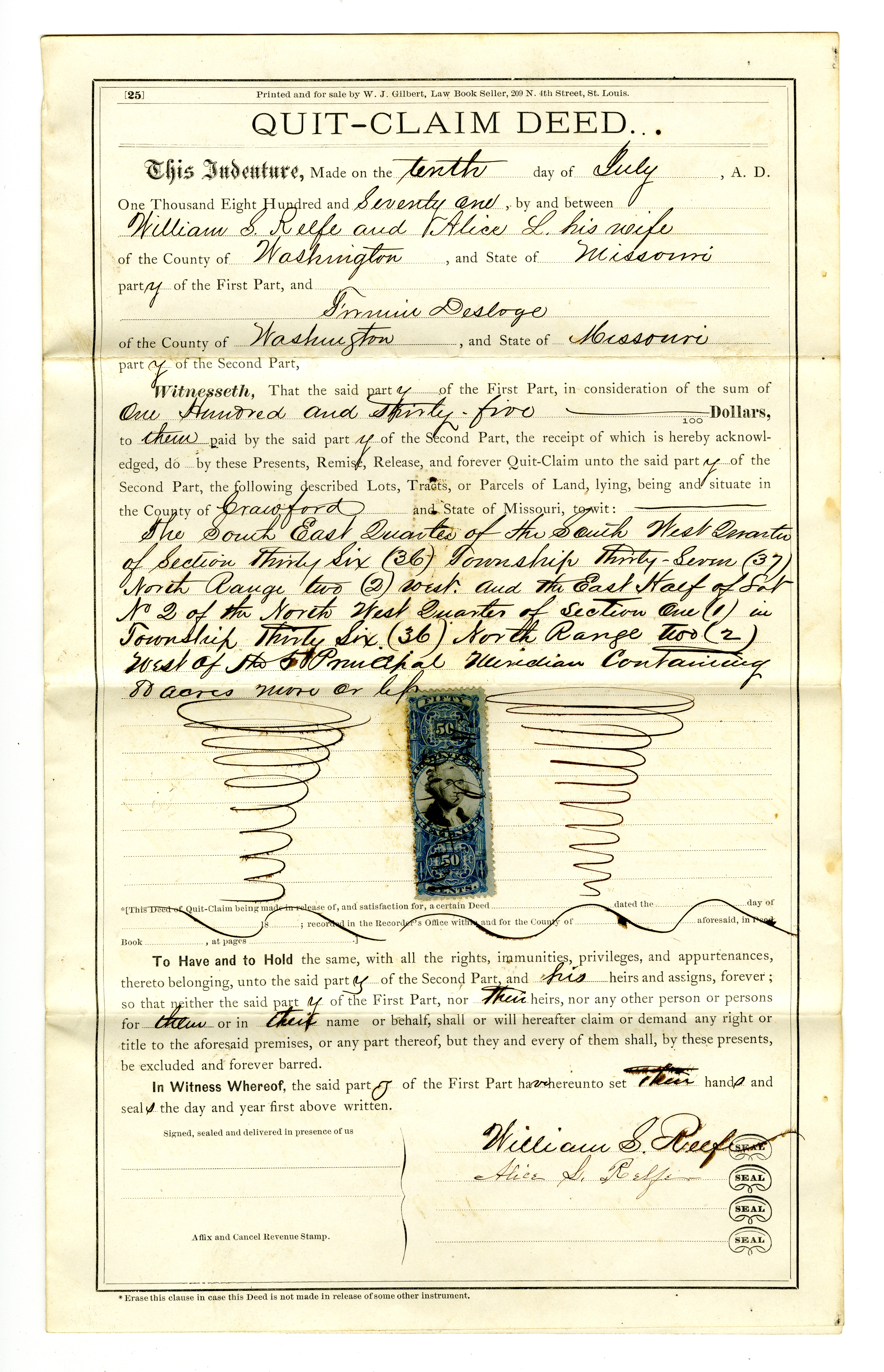
Missouri State quitclaim deed, 1871

In most arms-length real property transactions, such as a house sale, it is normal for the seller or grantor to warrant that they actually own the property or the interest in it that they are purporting to transfer. But a quitclaim deed contains no such warranty, and the grantee is entitled only to whatever interest the grantor actually possesses at the time. Indeed, a quitclaim deed may offer the grantee no warranty at all regarding the status of the property's title (ownership), and there may be no guarantee that the grantor owns an interest in the property at all.

Because of the lack of warranty, quitclaim deeds are most often used in specific situations where a precise definition of the grantor's interest is unnecessary, such as where property is being transferred as a gift, to a family member, or into a business entity. For example, when a spouse is to acquire the marital home as part of a divorce settlement, the other spouse may be able to transfer their full interest quickly and inexpensively via a quitclaim deed. A quitclaim deed may also be used to transfer title of a property to a purchaser following a foreclosure auction. Typically such a deed will not warrant that the property title is free and clear, and it remains up to the grantee to check that the property is not subject to any legal encumbrances.

Usage varies by state, and in Massachusetts quitclaim deeds include statutory warranties (similar to "special warranty deeds" in other states) and are the norm rather than the exception.

Execution of a quitclaim deed is relatively simple, and may require little more than the signature of the parties. Some states require the deed to be notarized or acknowledged before a notary. Some states permit a jurat, also known as a verification upon oath or affirmation, in which the affiant swears to the truth of the contents of the document, and signs the document in front of the notary.

== See also ==
- Bargain and sale deed
- Estoppel by deed
- Warranty deed
