= Provision (contracting) =

Written term or condition used in a solicitation

In United States government contracting, a provision or solicitation provision is a written term or condition used in a solicitation. A solicitation provision applies only before a contract is awarded to a vendor. This distinguishes provisions from clauses, which apply after contracts are awarded (and possibly before).

== See also ==
- The Government Contracts Reference Book: A Comprehensive Guide to the Language of Procurement, Third Edition, Softcover, Ralph C. Nash Jr., Karen R. O'Brien, Steven L. Schooner, Vernon J. Edwards, pages 99 and 466
