= Constructive eviction =

Vacation of a property by a tenant due to actions, or inaction, by the landlord

Constructive eviction is a circumstance where a tenant's use of the property is so significantly impeded by actions under the landlord's authority that the tenant has no alternative but to vacate the premises. The doctrine applies when a landlord of real property has acted in a way that renders the property uninhabitable. Constructive eviction does not have to be intentional by the landlord, and acts can range from failure to remove pests or fix necessary appliances, to changing locks or creating a hostile environment.

Three conditions must be met for a circumstance to qualify as constructive eviction:

- Wrongful conduct by the landlord
- that substantially interfered with a tenant's use and enjoyment of a rental property

If a tenant is sued by their landlord because the tenant abandoned the property or failed to pay rent, the tenant can use constructive eviction as a defense. If used successfully, this defense protects the tenant from being held liable to the landlord for damages.

== See also ==
- Implied warranty of habitability
- Loud music
