= Certified Relocation and Transition Specialist =

In the United States, Certified Relocation and Transition Specialists (CRTS) are certified providers who assist older adults and their families through stressful transitions, such as moving to a senior living community or modifying a home to age in place.

The CRTS designation is awarded the by National Certification Board for Alzheimer Care (NCBAC) to individuals in the unregulated senior move, relocation and transition sector who meet certain requirements, including experience, eligibility and exams. All CRTS certificants become part of the CRTS Professional Registry, available on a national website.

CRTS professionals include realtors, local and long-distance movers, appraisers, estate sale specialists, home care professionals, professional organizers, senior move managers and others. CRTS professionals focus on alleviating client and family stress associated with relocation, related to such issues as health, personal asset management, dementia and family dynamics.
