= National Association of Realtors =

American trade association for real estate brokers

- Formation: May 12, 1908; 118 years ago
- Type: Trade association
- Tax ID no.: 36-1520690
- Legal status: 501(c)(6)
- Headquarters: 430 North Michigan Avenue; Chicago, Illinois, U.S.
- Members: 1.5 million (2024)
- President: Kevin Brown
- CEO: Nykia Wright
- Revenue: $328 million (2022)
- Expenses: $306 million (2022)
- Staff: 379 (2022)
- Volunteers: 2200 (2022)
- Website: www.nar.realtor

The National Association of Realtors (NAR) is an American trade association for those who work in the real estate industry. As of December 2023, it had over 1.5 million members, making it the largest trade association in the United States including NAR's institutes, societies, and councils, involved in all aspects of the residential and commercial real estate industries. The organization holds a U.S. trademark on the term "Realtor". NAR also functions as a self-regulatory organization for real estate brokerage. The organization is headquartered in Chicago.

== Overview ==
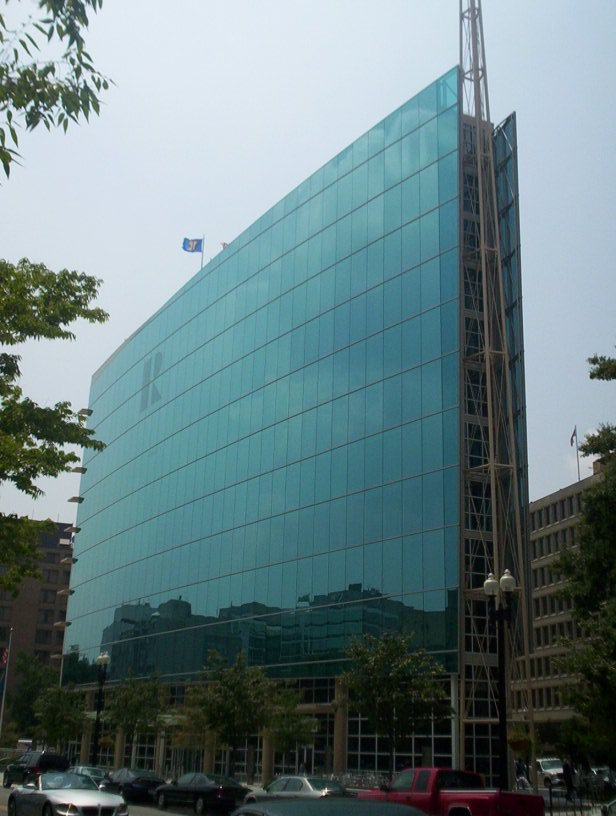
National Association of Realtors building on New Jersey Ave, NW, Washington DC

The National Association of Realtors was founded on May 12, 1908 as the National Association of Real Estate Exchanges in Chicago, Illinois. In 1916, it changed its name to The National Association of Real Estate Boards (NAREB). The current name was adopted in 1972.

NAR's members are residential and commercial real estate brokers, real estate salespeople, property managers, appraisers, counselors, and others engaged in all aspects of the real estate (immovable property) industry, where a state license to practice is required. Members belong to one or more of some 1,600 local realtor boards or associations. They are pledged to a code of ethics and standards of practice, a version of which was first adopted in 1913.

The organization has also been involved in initiatives related to digital transformation, including the adoption of technology standards, data-sharing frameworks, and tools that support real estate professionals in managing property and transaction data.

== Multiple Listing Service (MLS) systems ==
The NAR governs the hundreds of local Multiple Listing Services (MLSs) which are the information exchanges used across the nation by real estate brokers. (However, many MLSs are independent of NAR, although membership is typically limited to licensed brokers and their agents; MLSPIN is an example of one of the larger independent MLSs in North America.)

Through a complicated arrangement, NAR sets the policies for most of the Multiple Listings Services, and in the late 1990s, with the growth of the Internet, NAR evolved regulations allowing Internet Data Exchanges (IDX) whereby brokers would allow a portion of their data to be seen on the Internet via brokers' or agents' websites and Virtual Office Websites (VOW) which required potential buyers to register to obtain information.

These policies allowed participants—whether they were individual one-person brokers or large regional companies—to limit access to some or all of the MLS data by individual brokers (whether they were brokers operating solely on the Internet or local competitors). In 2005, this prompted the Department of Justice to file an antitrust lawsuit against NAR alleging its MLS rules regarding these types of limitations on the display of data were the product of a conspiracy to restrain trade by excluding brokers who used the Internet to operate differently from traditional brick-and-mortar brokers. (For a description of the DOJ action, see Antitrust Case filings for U.S. vs. National Association of Realtors.) Meanwhile, various real estate trends such as expanded consumer access and the Internet are consolidating existing local MLS organizations into larger and more statewide or regional MLS systems, such as in California and Virginia/Maryland/Washington, D.C.'s Metropolitan Regional Information Systems.

In response to the case, NAR had proposed setting up a single Internet Listing Display system which would not allow participants to exclude individual brokers (whether of a bricks-and-mortar type or solely internet-based) but require a blanket opting out of display on all other brokers' sites. This system became the IDX system. Although IDX allows the public to view MLS listings, it still requires the listing brokerage information to be placed on the listing every place it appears (brokers legally "own" the listings of their brokerage), to prevent misrepresentation of the listing information, and to place accountability for the information on the broker as the law dictates.

The antitrust lawsuit was settled in May 2008. The settlement agreement mandated that all Multiple Listing Service systems allow access to Internet-based competitors. It required NAR to treat online brokers the same as traditional brokers and barred NAR from excluding online brokers from membership because they do not have a traditional business model. The NAR admitted no wrongdoing, and it paid neither fines nor damages as part of the deal. A federal judge formally approved the settlement in November 2008. NAR's general counsel believed that the settlement would not affect commissions paid by the general public, but a business professor at Western Michigan University predicted that the increased competition would cause a 25 to 50 percent decrease in commissions.

Another major anti-competitive practice is supported (indirectly) by various state laws which prohibit the "sharing" of commissions with unlicensed individuals. In broad interpretations, this is deemed to prevent a buyers' agent from providing credit to his or her buyers from commissions received. Currently, there are 10 states where real estate agents and brokers are barred from offering homebuyers or sellers cash rebates or gifts of any kind with a cash value of more than $25. Various realtors in such states have successfully contested this interpretation in states which now allow the practice (notably, Patrick Lea, a realtor in Ohio, and numerous agents in Kentucky). The Kentucky case was ultimately tried with the United States Department of Justice as the plaintiff and the Kentucky Real Estate Commission as the defendant.

In 2019, the National Association of Realtors' board approved the Clear Cooperation Policy, which requires brokers to submit a listing to the Multiple Listings Service within one business day of marketing a property to the public.

== Lobbying ==
The National Association of Realtors is considered one of the most powerful special interests in the United States. In 2023, the organization spent $52 million on lobbying, ranking second on the OpenSecrets list of top spenders. It has spent a total of $850 million on lobbying since 1998.

The Real Estate Political Education Committee (REPEC), a political action committee, was formed in 1969 for the purpose of electing realtor-friendly candidates. It was renamed the Realtors Political Action Committee (RPAC) in 1974 following changes to federal election law. RPAC now claims to be the largest trade association PAC in the country and gives around $4 million per year to candidates who support real estate interests. The N.A.R.'s website says "RPAC is one of the most bipartisan PACs in the country, giving to both Democrats and Republicans alike", and historically half of its expenditures have gone to Democrats, and the other half to Republicans.

Around 2019, N.A.R. created and solely funded an affiliate nonprofit called the American Property Owners Alliance. In its first four years, the nonprofit gave $12.8 million in grants, with almost $10 million going to Republican-aligned super PACs and groups with conservative agendas.

== Role in housing segregation ==
Between 1924 and 1950, the Realtor Code of Ethics included explicit references to racial segregation.

A realtor should never be instrumental in introducing into a neighborhood… members of any race or nationality or any individual whose presence will be clearly detrimental to property values in that neighborhood.

— Code of Ethics, National association of real estate boards, 1924

Realtors were prohibited from helping Black homebuyers move into white neighborhoods and faced career-ending penalties for not complying. The clause encouraging segregation was not fully removed from the Realtor Code of Ethics until 1974.

The National Association of Realtors opposed the Fair Housing Act in 1968, which outlawed racial discrimination in home sales.

== Enabling the subprime mortgage crisis ==
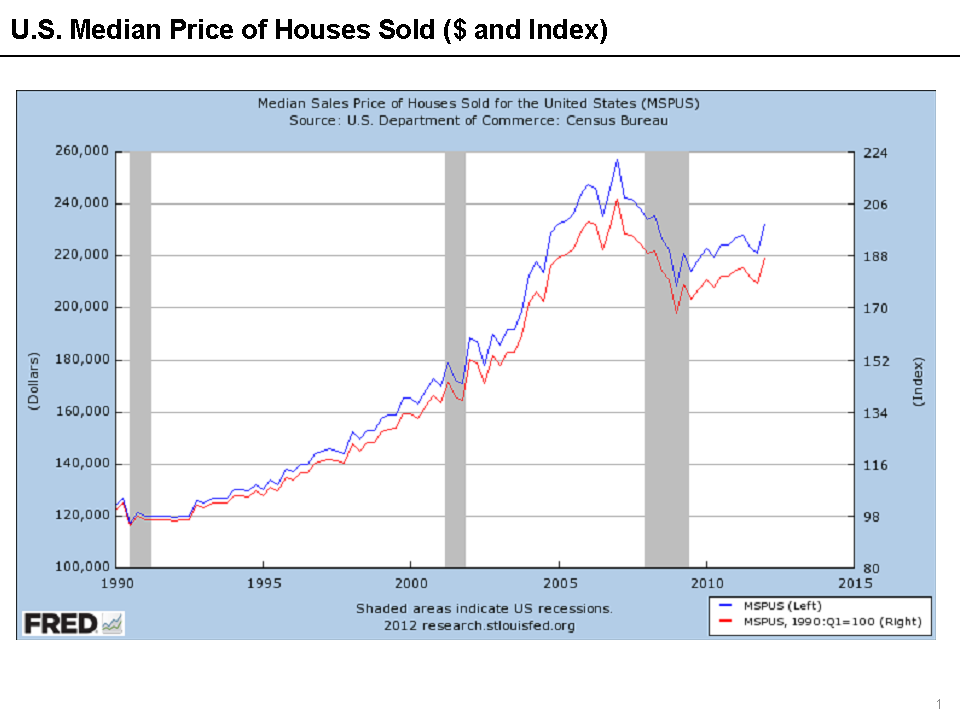
U.S. Median Price of Homes Sold

Some experts believe that brokers and realtors bear at least partial responsibility for the subprime mortgage crisis, purposefully inflating the perceived market values of homes, and subsequently encouraging buyers to take out larger mortgages than needed. The theory is that collusion with mortgage lenders enabled realtors to earn high volumes of commission on borrowed money for inflated house values with no risk to the realtors. Many victims feel that home buyers were tricked into taking out larger loans to buy more expensive homes, and the higher sales prices paid the realtors higher commissions. This practice is not considered "unethical" by the NAR which claims to be a Self-regulatory organization; however, obvious implications show extensive and substantial harm rendered to the public. Many victims are encouraging the Securities and Exchange Commission to begin aggressively regulating agents and refunding overpayments to homebuyers.

== Antitrust lawsuits ==
In 2005, the United States Department of Justice filed a formal complaint against the National Association of Realtors for violating Section 4 of the Sherman Antitrust Act. The complaint sought to enjoin the National Association of Realtors "from maintaining or enforcing a policy that restrains competition from brokers who use the Internet to more efficiently and cost effectively serve home sellers and buyers, and from adopting other related anticompetitive rules.

The DOJ challenged NAR's MLS rules that inhibited competition from Internet-based brokers. On November 18, 2008, the Court entered a Final Judgment approving a settlement against NAR. Under the Final Judgment, the NAR agreed to the policies challenged by the United States and replaced those policies with rules that do not discriminate against brokers who use the Internet to provide low-priced brokerage services to consumers.

In 2012, American Home Realty Network, Inc., the operator of NeighborCity, filed antitrust counterclaims in response to a pair of copyright lawsuits, alleging that the "copyright lawsuits filed against it by two multiple listing services with financial backing from the National Association of Realtors are part of a concerted effort by NAR to drive the company out of business and eliminate it as a provider of services to real estate brokers." The counter-claims also allege that the copyrights asserted were never properly registered. In the Minnesota case, which recites claims against the NAR but does not directly name the NAR as a counter-defendant, AHRN filed a second amended counterclaim adding Edina Realty and Home Services of America as Counter-Defendants in the antitrust and unfair competition claims. Edina Realty is a subsidiary of HomeServices of America, Inc., a Berkshire Hathaway company, which owns real estate brokerage firms in states across the country, including Minnesota, Maryland, North Carolina, Georgia, Washington, Oregon, Arizona, Rhode Island, Connecticut, Iowa, Nebraska, Ohio, Illinois, Kansas, South Carolina, Missouri, Pennsylvania, Indiana, Kentucky, Alabama, and California. Earlier in 2012, the mid-Atlantic multiple listing service Metropolitan Regional Information Systems, Inc. (MRIS) and St. Paul, MN-based Regional Multiple Listing Service of Minnesota Inc. (NorthstarMLS) filed copyright claims against NeighborCity. The National Association of Realtors said it would provide financial support for NorthstarMLS and MRIS legal expenses.

Another lawsuit was filed in March 2019 challenging NAR's compensation policies which require all member brokers demand blanket, non-negotiable buyer-side commission fees when listing a home on a Multiple Listing Service (MLS).

=== Burnett et al v. National Association of Realtors et al ===
On October 31, 2023, a federal civil jury found that the NAR had conspired to inflate commissions paid to home-buyers' real estate agents, and determined that NAR and its codefendants owed damages of almost US$1.8 billion. The lawsuit, Burnett et al v. National Association of Realtors et al, was heard in the U.S. District Court for the Western District of Missouri in Kansas City, and involved allegations of violations of federal and state antitrust laws by the NAR, HomeServices of America, Keller Williams Realty, Anywhere Real Estate (parent of Coldwell Banker, Century 21 Real Estate, and Sotheby's International Realty) and Re/Max. Anywhere and Re/Max had previously settled their liability and agreed to pay lesser damages, leaving NAR, HomeServices and Keller Williams to defend the suit at trial. Upon announcement of the verdict and before final judgment was entered, NAR and HomeServices stated their intention to appeal, and Keller Williams was considering doing so. In March 2024, NAR agreed to settle for a reduction of damages to US$418 million, eliminating its rules on commissions, and waiving its right to appeal. As a result of the settlement, starting August 2024, buyers’ agents commission fees are not allowed to be advertised and buyers must sign a contract with their agent before seeing properties together. The Wall Street Journal reported the settlement is expected to reduce real estate commissions, force some agents out of the industry, and lead to a decline in NAR’s membership.

== Specializations ==
=== Educational requirements and recognized designations ===
Realtors, as members of NAR, also have the option of studying for additional certifications in a variety of specialties, several of which are backed by NAR with offerings of certification and update courses available nationwide.

== Consumer outreach ==
The NAR launched HouseLogic.com in February 2010 in an attempt to reach consumers directly for the first time.

== Other national real estate associations ==
- Canadian Association of Accredited Mortgage Professionals
- Canadian Real Estate Association
- National Association of Estate Agents
- National Association of Real Estate Brokers

== See also ==
- Real estate trends
- Estate agent
- List of real estate topics
- United States housing bubble
- Housing Affordability Index
- Real property
