= Investment rating for real estate =

Method of measuring risk-adjusted returns on real estate property investments

An investment rating of a real estate property measures the property's risk-adjusted returns relative to a completely risk-free asset. Mathematically, a property's investment rating is the return a risk-free asset would have to yield to be considered as good an investment as the property being evaluated.

The underlying drivers for property ratings are the dividends (net operating income) and capital gains over a given holding period, along with their associated risks or variances. Similar to financial ratings developed for mutual funds and stocks, ratings models typically assume that investors have constant relative risk aversion over the wealth derived from both other sources and their investments. A property's investment rating is then a transformation of the risk-adjusted averaged return into a single number that conveys the property's long-term potential to yield profits.

== Home as an investment asset ==
Adam Smith wrote in The Wealth of Nations (Book II, Chapter 1) that "a dwelling-house, as such, contributes nothing to the revenue of its inhabitants." The Economist has reported that most Americans were treating their homes as investments until 2008. The traditional belief that home ownership is a necessary milestone to acquiring wealth nonetheless persists; research consistently shows that homeowners accumulate significantly more wealth over time than renters, though the relationship is shaped by timing, location, and broader market conditions. Not everyone considers their home a long-term property investment asset: some hold that better risk-adjusted returns are available in other asset classes over the long run, with studies finding that periods of stock market growth can outpace housing appreciation, particularly when transaction costs and illiquidity are factored in. By owning a home to live in, the owner not only saves on rent but also benefits from any long-term price appreciation. Investors who buy to rent are primarily seeking financial gains, whether monthly cash flow income, long-term capital growth, or both.

== Rating evaluation ==
Objective evaluation of a property's intrinsic long-term value requires a rating process comparable in rigour to those used for stocks and funds. Knowing a property's current market price is necessary but not sufficient, particularly in uncertain market conditions.

There are many macro and micro factors that can affect a property's financial returns, including price appreciation, rental demand, vacancy rates, fair market value, mortgage costs, maintenance expenses, property tax, property management fees, and home insurance. A sound rating analysis should cover all aspects of location, from national and state level down to metro, county, city, and neighbourhood. Ratings are best understood as relative measures used to rank properties by their comparative investment potential rather than as absolute predictions.

=== Location-based risk classifications ===
Beyond individual property ratings, investment analysts and commentators use broader location-level classifications to guide decisions. At the positive end, locations with strong population growth, infrastructure investment, and tight housing supply are typically rated as high-growth prospects. At the negative end, certain suburbs or localities are identified as unsuitable for investment and informally described as "no-go zones" in property investment commentary. This usage is distinct from the security and political meanings of the term and refers instead to areas considered high-risk due to factors such as chronic oversupply, weak rental yields, and limited capital growth prospects. In Australia, annual reports identifying such suburbs have attracted coverage in mainstream property media. The term has also been applied at a whole-market level: the Home Builders Federation described London as a "no-go zone for housing investment" in 2025, citing planning delays, building safety regulation, and affordability barriers as factors making many development schemes unviable.

== Uses of real estate ratings ==
Investment ratings serve different purposes depending on the user. For investors, ratings help identify the best locations and properties, establish appropriate price ranges, estimate rental income, and project long-term cash flow and appreciation. For sellers and listing agents, ratings provide objective criteria to support pricing decisions and help differentiate properties in a competitive market. For lenders, ratings assist in establishing the collateral value of a property, assessing potential losses in a foreclosure, and informing decisions on loan modification.

== Established rating systems ==
Several rating systems and indices have been developed to evaluate real estate investment quality at different scales.

The Case-Shiller home price index, developed by economists Karl Case and Robert Shiller and now maintained by S&P Global, tracks changes in residential property prices across major US metropolitan areas using a repeat-sales methodology. It is widely used as a benchmark for market-level analysis.

Morningstar DBRS provides credit ratings for structured finance products including residential mortgage-backed securities (RMBS), applying quantitative models to assess the credit risk of pooled mortgage portfolios.

Fitch Ratings and S&P Global Ratings both publish ratings for residential and commercial mortgage-backed securities, assessing the credit risk of pooled property loans. Studies of the pre-2008 financial crisis have examined how ratings from these agencies influenced the structured finance market and the subsequent fallout when underlying mortgage quality deteriorated.

The Global Property Guide publishes country-level investment ratings showing where buy-to-let property historically earns the highest returns across international markets.

== See also ==
- Real estate investing
- Property investment
- Case-Shiller index
- Mortgage-backed security
- No-go zone
