= Warranty deed =

Real estate transfer with title guarantee

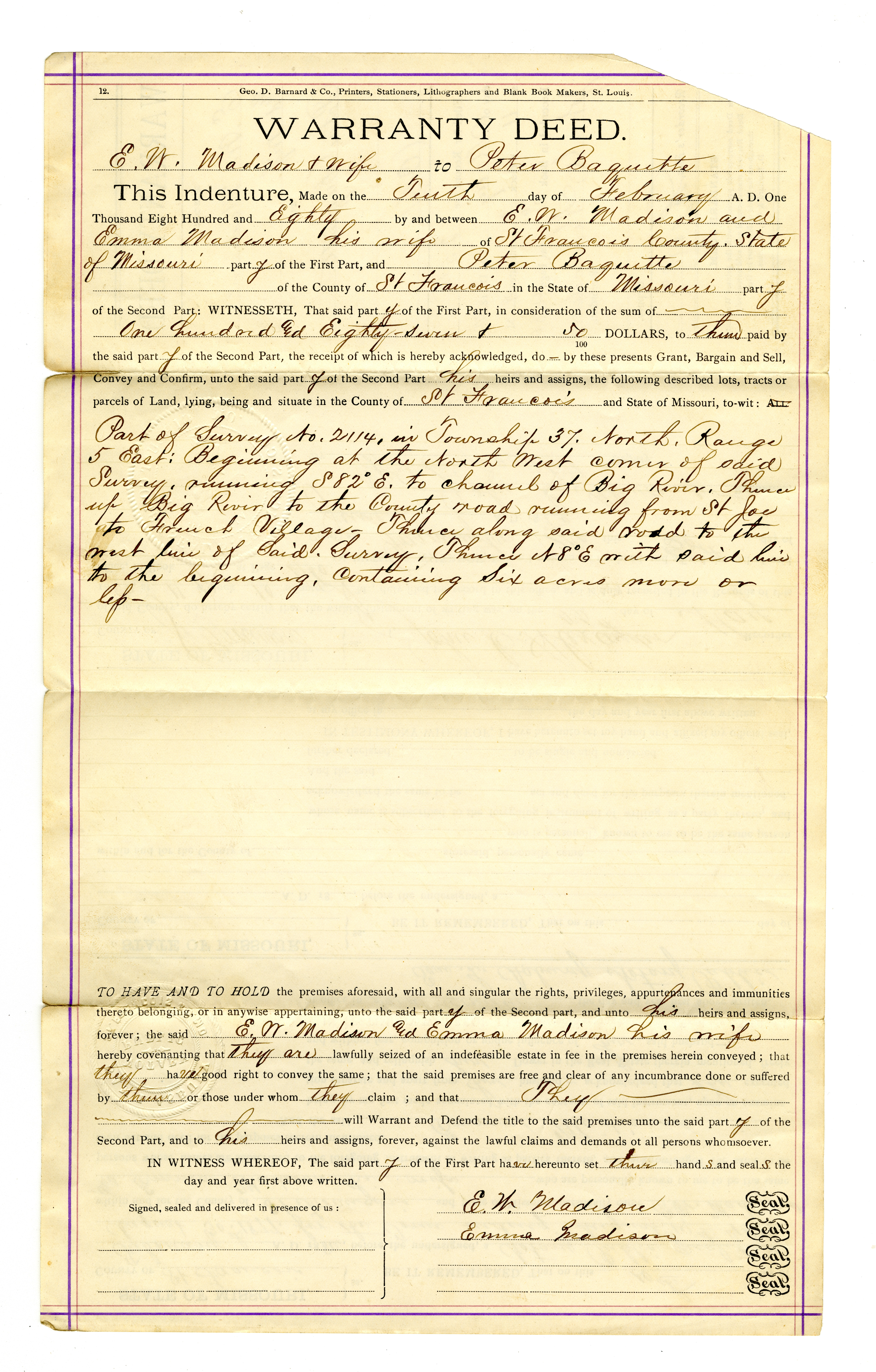
Warranty deed signed E. W. Madison and Emma Madison, St. Francois County, Missouri, February 10, 1880

A warranty deed is a type of deed where the grantor (seller) guarantees that they hold clear title to a piece of real estate and has a right to sell it to the grantee (buyer), in contrast to a quitclaim deed, where the seller does not guarantee that they hold title to a piece of real estate. A general warranty deed protects the grantee against title defects arising at any point in time, extending back to the property's origins. A special warranty deed protects the grantee only against title defects arising from the actions or omissions of the grantor.

== Covenants for title ==
A warranty deed can include six traditional forms of covenants for title, sometimes known as the English covenants of title. Those six traditional forms of covenants can be broken down into two categories: present covenants and future covenants.

Present covenants

- Covenant of seisin: "A covenant of seisin or good right to convey."
- Covenant of right to convey: Covenants that represent the seller's promise that they have a valid title of the property being conveyed and have not contracted to sell it to another.
- Covenant against encumbrances: Seller promises that there are no encumbrances, other than those that have been previously disclosed.

Future covenants

- Covenant of quiet enjoyment: "The covenant of warranty is an assurance or guarantee of title, or an agreement or assurance by the grantor of an estate that the grantee and their heirs and assigns will enjoy it without interruption by virtue of a paramount title and that they will not, by force of a paramount title, be evicted from the land or deprived of its possession"
- Covenant of warranty: Covenants that represent seller's promise to protect the buyer against anyone who comes along later and claims paramount title to the property.
- Covenant of further assurances: The covenant of further assurances requires the seller to take affirmative steps to cure any defects in the grantor's title.

Most buyers perform a title search to determine if there are defects in title that must be resolved before they purchase real property. A title search provides constructive notice of any encumbrances, easements, or restrictions on the property being conveyed, and is generally considered part of a buyer's due diligence in the process of purchasing real estate. Buyers can also purchase title insurance to protect against title defects. A warranty deed is not a substitute for title insurance because, if the grantor later dies or goes bankrupt, the grantee may not be able to exercise the warranty.
