= Multiple listing service =

Real estate listing information

A multiple listing service (MLS, also multiple listing system or multiple listings service) is an organization with a suite of services that real estate brokers use to establish contractual offers of cooperation and compensation (among brokers) and accumulate and disseminate information to enable appraisals. A multiple listing service's database and software is used by real estate brokers in real estate (or in other industries, for example, aircraft brokers), representing sellers under a listing contract to widely share information about properties with other brokers who may represent potential buyers or wish to work with a seller's broker in finding a buyer for the property or asset. The listing data stored in a multiple listing service's database is the proprietary information of the broker who has obtained a listing agreement with a property's seller.

== Origin ==
According to the U.S. National Association of Realtors:

In the late 1800s, real estate brokers regularly gathered at the offices of their local associations to share information about properties they were trying to sell. They agreed to compensate other brokers who helped sell those properties, and the first MLS was born, based on a fundamental principle that's unique to organized real estate: Help me sell my inventory and I'll help you sell yours.

The term "MLS" is considered generic in the United States and cannot be trademarked or branded. MLSs can be owned and operated by individual realtor associations, regional multi-association conglomerates or independent cooperatives of real estate brokerages. There is no single authoritative MLS. However, there is a data standard for MLS systems. The Real Estate Standards Organization provides the Data Dictionary for common real estate terms and data structures, and the RESO Web API for data transport. A previous common data transport standard, RETS, has been deprecated.

== Purpose and benefits ==
The primary purpose of an MLS is to provide a facility to publish a "unilateral offer of compensation" by a listing broker, to other broker participants in that MLS. In other words, the commission rate that is offered by the listing broker is published within the MLS to other cooperating brokers. This offer of compensation is considered a contractual obligation; however, it can be negotiated at any time between the listing broker and the broker representing the buyer. Many Realtors feel commission is not negotiable after an offer is received, but the National Association of Realtors states it can be negotiated at any time. Since the commission for a transaction as well as the property features are contained in the MLS system, it is in the best interests of the brokers to maintain accurate and timely data.

The additional benefit of MLS systems is that an MLS subscriber may search an MLS and retrieve information about all homes for sale by all participating brokers. MLS systems contain hundreds of fields of information about the features of a property. These fields are determined by real estate professionals who are knowledgeable and experienced in that local marketplace.

== Limitations on access and other criticisms ==
There are currently 529 Multiple Listing Services in the US. They are owned by associations of realtors individually, collectively, or by, in a small number of cases, brokers. They are not freely accessible to anyone and a fee must be paid to be a user. In addition, only licensed real estate agents, and brokers, and appraisers are eligible to belong to an MLS.

In response, the Federal Trade Commission investigated, found several violations of anti-trust laws, and entered into settlements with five MLSes to enable free competition for listings. One MLS, Realcomp in Michigan, refused to enter a settlement/consent agreement with the FTC, asserting it had the right to hide listings of discounters because such competition is detrimental to the revenue of its members. In 2006, the FTC filed a lawsuit against the Realcomp MLS alleging violations of federal anti-trust laws and squelching free competition. The lawsuit went to trial in 2007 and the FTC lost, but won the case in a 4–0 unanimous ruling on appeal in 2009.

In Canada, CREA has come under scrutiny and investigation by the Competition Bureau and litigation by former CREA member and real estate brokerage Realtysellers (Ontario) Ltd., for the organization's control over the Canadian MLS system. In 2001, Realtysellers (Ontario) Ltd., a discount real-estate firm was launched that reduced the role of agents and the commissions they collect from home buyers and sellers. The brokerage later shut down and launched a $100 million lawsuit against CREA and TREB, alleging that they breached an earlier out-of-court settlement that the parties entered into in 2003.

== Asia ==
=== India ===
Listings of India specializing in multiple listing services launched a platform in Dec 2015 in India, for the first time, to connect all authorized Real Estate Agents/Brokers/Agency/ Promotes/Builders through one platform; to showcase their property listings for wider exposure among the network.

=== Philippines ===
The Philippine Association of Real Estate Boards (PAREB) operates the PAREB MLS, an Multi Listing Service (MLS) which provide real time property listing exchange nationwide among PAREB Brokers.

=== Vietnam ===
The Vietnam Multiple Listing Service was started in 2010. The MLS in Vietnam is based around the U.S. model, with some changes to accommodate different local market conditions. In particular, the system supports open agency listings as well as MLS listings, as the current market operates mainly on the open agency model. FSBO listings, however, are not allowed.

== Australia ==
There is no general MLS for Australia; however, a private company Investorist operates a specialised MLS for off the plan property, which is used by some Australian developers and master agents. Investorist is also accessed by international agents.

realestate.com.au Pty. Ltd. operates Property Platform, which allows real-time reservations and eCommerce reservation fee processing.

== Middle East ==
=== Bahrain ===
Bahrain Real Estate Multilevel Listing Solution – mlsBH is a localized and enhanced version of RETS based MLS service but still in its early stage of implementation and integration within the property sector of Bahrain. mlsBH is owned and operated by a private company since 2015 and unlike conventional MLS; is not restricted to dealing with brokers only. Via RealtorBH; a set of FSRBO classes which along with extended broker classes are facilitated to directly submit their exclusive listings, which after verification are centralized in mlsBH. Furthermore it also directly syndicates centralized listings on RealtyBH – a local comparable of US' Zillow. With the introduction of Bahrain RERA in 2018 operators of mlsBH aligned themselves with the policies of the regulator.

=== Israel ===
The MLS in Israel has been operating since 1990 only in the Jerusalem . The Israel Multiple Listing Service began in 2013 and is managed by a Multiple Listing Service LTD.

== Europe ==
=== Czech Republic ===
There are not any MLS services in the Czech Republic. With high demand and low surplus of available properties, there is no need for agents to split commission as there is not a lack of buyers.

=== Italy ===
In Italy there are many MLSs and it is possible to choose between different software enabling real estate agencies either to manage and share their properties with others or to syndicate their listings on the web, or both the two things as it happens on MLS Agent RE and, as of 2021, it had 89,22% of market shares as stated in the "Reti e Aggregazioni Immobiliari 2021" report. Unlike the US model, in agent one there is no obligation for members to include properties in the mls.

Although many countries are lacking regulations regarding real estate transactions, lately there are attempts to align with those in developed markets, among which the only one managed directly by real estate agents is the “confederazione reti Mls”. the confederation brings together a series of mls local networks that adhere to the confederation's code of ethics, and differs from other mls networks in Italy for the obligation to pre-qualify properties and the sharing of the entire list of properties. The site of the confederation for customers, who can choose the real estate agent regardless of whether he is the holder of the assignment or not, is immobilimls.

=== Cyprus, Turkey, Portugal and Spain ===
The UltraIT Multiple Listing Service (MLS) is a “Trade Only” property network of estate agents. Agents subscribed to the MLS have the ability to search this database of property sales and property rentals properties from a growing number of subscribing estate agents, providing each agent the ability to access and search the UltraIT MLS system of ten’s of thousands of properties all over the world, currently including Cyprus, Turkey, Portugal and areas in Spain such as the Costa Blanca, Costa del Sol, Barcelona and Tenerife. All Entrepreneur Real Estate Agents (TUGEM) of Turkey has started MLS based database with its members, mainly international brands that works in Turkey. TUGEM has start working relation with www.cepi.eu/ and www.nar.realtor to amalgamate their resources. Ministry of Land Registry in Turkey has started www.yourkeyturkey.gov.tr web based portal to work with TUGEM and TUGEM GLOBAL to expend their services and their database of all listings and land registry information. TUGEM is planning to launch their full MLS system in Mid- 2021.

=== United Kingdom ===
In the United Kingdom, MLS – Multiple Listing Systems do exist via some of the agents software providers, but many software providers have only designed their software to work in one company (typically for firms working across a large office footprint). One hurdle to the traditional MLS comes as a result of mixed software packages among agencies that do not allow them to cross share data between other company, so MLS in the United Kingdom is in its infancy and a cross data platform now exists via INEA.

MLS History in the United Kingdom. In the 1980s and early/mid 1990s agents did work together much like the early U.S. and Canadian realtors via paper-based forms which had tick-boxes offering a listing from one agent to sub-agents. Attached would be the property details pre-agreed with the owner for correctness, a photographic negative of photo; later a similar procedure was carried out by email and graphic computer file. Agents involved could copy and process the paper- or email-based property data. The main agent was treated as the vendor; all sales progression went through her and commission was split upon completion.

The Dark Years: In the late 1990s many of the smaller agencies were acquired by larger companies, breaking many of the MLS relationships that existed. More software options came in (all in competition) and, as the software houses did not work together, their collectives of agents became fragmented by non-collaborative out-of-group software restraints. With large property portals gaining ground in the 2000s agents in the UK started working alone as all could upload to the same portal platforms.

MLS Today: In the UK there are a number of seedling MLS systems that attempt to connect agents horizontally. INEA, Lonres and AgentHub.com are examples of sites that serve similar functions to US MLS counterparts, however there are insufficient data to conclude that any of these systems are used popularly across the country.

The future of MLS in the UK: The future of the MLS in the UK is uncertain at the time of writing (2017). With most home buyers beginning property search online via nationwide property portals, it would seem that the requirement for property sharing between agencies is significantly diminished. Large UK property portals vastly improve liquidity in the residential real estate market by connecting buyers with agents in an information-rich environment. In essence, horizontal sharing of inventory between agents – formerly conducted through the MLS – is now replaced by a vertical interaction between estate agents and centralised advertising portals such as Rightmove and Zoopla.

This said, it is not entirely inconceivable that new systems will be introduced to the market that share information horizontally across the market, not only between agents (under a fee sharing arrangement), but with other participants in the transaction such as mortgagors and surveyors. Moreover, UK estate agencies have shown resistance to the inflating fees charged by large property portals. In any case, the future of MLS in the UK will most probably be shaped by changes to competition law, consumer behaviours and the rate of technological advancement.

=== Switzerland ===
In Switzerland, the adoption of Multiple Listing Systems (MLS) has been growing in recent years, particularly in urban areas such as Zurich, Geneva, and Basel. While the Swiss real estate market is traditionally characterized by exclusive brokerage agreements, several platforms now promote MLS practices to enhance collaboration between real estate agents. Platforms like Properstar, ImmoScout24, and Homegate provide functionalities that allow agents to share property listings, offering buyers and sellers access to a broader range of options. However, the adoption of MLS in Switzerland is still less widespread compared to countries like the United States or Canada due to the fragmented nature of the local real estate market. Despite this, interest in MLS as a tool to improve efficiency and transparency in real estate transactions is steadily increasing.

== Central America ==
=== Costa Rica ===
There are two main real estate organizations in Costa Rica: CRGAR (Costa Rica Global Association of Realtors), and CCCBR (Costa Rican Chamber of Commerce for Real Estate). Of these two associations only CRGAR has an MLS system in place.

CRGAR is associated with the NAR (a US based National Association of Realtors). According to the CRGAR website, as of October 2019 they have just over 120 individual agent members and sponsors.

The actual number of real estate agents in Costa Rica is unknown. Agents are not required under the law to meet any minimal licensing standards nor are they required to join any association in order to become a realtor. Anyone can be an agent without pre-qualification.

A few private real estate companies have set up their own MLS systems, some claiming to be the only official MLS, but these are not directly affiliated with any Costa Rica based real estate associations.

== North America ==
In North America, the MLS systems are governed by private entities, and the rules are set by those entities with no state or federal oversight, beyond any individual state rules regarding real estate. MLS systems set their own rules for membership, access, and sharing of information. An MLS may be owned and operated by a real estate company, a county or regional real estate board of realtors or association of realtors, or by a trade association. Membership in the MLS is not required for the practice of real estate brokerage. The most current list of North American MLSs shows over 500 organizations in Canada and the United States.

=== Canada ===
In Canada, the national MLS is a cooperative system for the members of the Canadian Real Estate Association (CREA), working through Canada's 101 real estate boards and 13 provincial/territorial associations. Both the terms Realtor and MLS are registered trademarks for both the members and data of the CREA. The Real Estate Board of Greater Vancouver claims to have pioneered the first MLS in Canada. A publicly accessible website allows consumers to search an aggregated subset of each participating board's MLS database of active listings, providing limited details and directing consumers to contact a real estate agent for more information.

While most real estate boards participate in the national MLS, known as the Data Distribution System, others provide listings to a Quebec-based service known as Centris. Still others, such as the Toronto Regional Real Estate Board (TRREB), operate their own MLS.

In 2007, the real estate brokerage Realtysellers shut down after alleging that CREA and TRREB had modified their rules to hinder flat-fee MLS services on behalf of those selling houses themselves. In 2010, CREA settled with the Competition Bureau, and agreed to allow flat-fee listings. However, some real estate boards continued to bar the practice, citing interpretations of provincial laws requiring those trading in real estate to be licensed. Flat-free providers disputed the argument, claiming that their services were no different than posting listings on classifieds, and that they were not necessarily trading. In 2015, the Competition Bureau began a federal case against the TRREB "in hopes of breaking the real estate industry's stranglehold on the Multiple Listings Service."

=== Mexico ===
In Mexico, MLS systems have been slow to catch on, although there have been numerous attempts to create a national network. The first MLS system originated in Puerto Vallarta as www.MLSVallarta.com in 1988 and existed for a short period in the Los Cabos region as MLSCabo.com in the early 90s. They originated in these two markets as the majority of buyers are American or Canadian and familiar with the benefits of a MLS real estate system in their own home markets. MLS systems have not had as much success in other parts of Mexico. The Cabo system went through a few structural changes before contracting with FLEX MLS software in 2010. Today, it is represents over 90 brokers in the State of Baja California Sur, and is now called MLS BCS (www.mlsinbajasur.com), which operates as a corporation in which each subscriber Broker is permitted to own one voting share. Brokers and agents subscribe through MLS BCS upon meeting requirements and committing to following a strict set of Operating Policies and Procedures, requiring each listing to be Exclusive and the broker to have a complete property records file in his office on each listing. The MLS BCS has been invited to participate on the oversight council of the new Real Estate Agent License Registry, helping to write the Code of Ethics for the 2017 State License law. MLS BCS is generally recognized to be the model for MLS operation in the country. In Puerto Vallarta and Riviera Nayarit, MLSVallarta.com still services the region as the oldest and longest running MLS system in Mexico. MLSVallarta is a private, independent MLS system, with membership for both qualifying brokers and developers. The Puerto Vallarta and Riviera Nayarit real estate associations formed their own MLS system in 2012, known as www.VallartaNayaritMLS.com, adopting the same FLEX system used in the Los Cabos region. Rules of membership exist for both system in Vallarta systems and only legal existing real estate businesses can apply for membership. Both are well used by local brokers, developers and the buying/selling public.

=== United States ===
As of 2020, there are 580 MLSs in the US with that number decreasing due to consolidation trends. The largest MLS in the United States is currently California-Regional Multiple Listing Service (CRMLS), representing 110,000 real estate professionals. Other notable MLSs include Bright MLS with over 109,000, and Stellar MLS with over 75,000 Subscribers.

==== New York City ====
Although the other boroughs and Long Island have several different MLS, MLS has never taken hold in Manhattan. A small group of brokers formed the Manhattan Association of Realtors and operate MLSManhattan.com. MLSManhattan has a small fraction of the total active inventory in Manhattan. The Bronx Manhattan North MLS also offers coverage in Northern Manhattan. It too has failed to acquire widespread adoption by brokers.

The prevalent database is operated by the Real Estate Board of New York (REBNY), a non-Realtor entity that seceded from the National Association of Realtors in 1994. REBNY operates a database called RLS which stands for REBNY Listing Service. A predecessor of RLS was marketed as R.O.L.E.X (REBNY Online Listing Exchange) before the watchmaker Rolex claimed trademark infringement.

Like MLS, RLS has under contract, sold and days on market data, and houses rental listings as well. There is a database, which in 2011, was slated to be converted to the more familiar RETS standard in January 2012. The RLS gateway is populated by several private databases that include RealtyMX (RMX), Online Residential (OLR) and Realplus, another proprietary database available to Manhattan Brokers. These databases exchange data continually effectively creating several separate systems with essentially similar data. Another vendor, Klickads, Inc D/B/A Brokers NYC, owned by Lala Wang sued in 2007 to be included in the list of firms permitted to participate in the Gateway. REBNY also grandfathered the major brokerages including Douglas Elliman, Corcoran, Stribling, Bellmarc as participants to the Gateway.

Seriously committed Manhattan brokerages are members of REBNY, and thus one may find the vast majority of updated and valid listings in Manhattan are represented by RLS. The REBNY RLS requires all listings to be entered and disseminated within 24 hours (Until 2007 72 Hours to accommodate agencies without weekend data entry).

==== Policies on sharing MLS data in the US ====
The National Association of Realtors (NAR) has set policies that permit brokers to show limited MLS information on their websites under a system known as IDX or Internet Data Exchange. NAR has an ownership interest in Move Inc., the company which operates a website that has been given exclusive rights to display significant MLS information.

Using IDX search tools available on most real estate brokers' websites (as well as on many individual agents' sites), potential buyers may view properties available on the market, using search features such as location, type of property (single family, lease, vacant land, duplex), property features (number of bedrooms and bathrooms), and price ranges. In some instances photos can be viewed. Many allow for saving search criteria and for daily email updates of newly-available properties. However, if a potential buyer finds a property, he/she will still need to contact the listing agent (or their own agent) to view the house and make an offer.

The U.S. Department of Justice filed an antitrust lawsuit in September 2005 against the National Association of Realtors over NAR's policy which allowed brokers to restrict access to their MLS information from appearing on the websites of certain brokers which operate solely on the web. This policy applied to commercial entities which are also licensed brokerages, such as HomeGain, which solicit clients by internet advertising and then provide referrals to local agents in return for a fee of 25% to 35% of the commission.

The DOJ's antitrust claims also include NAR rules that exclude certain kinds of brokers from membership in MLSs. NAR has revised its policies on allowing access on web sites operated by member brokers and others to what might be considered as proprietary data.

The case was settled in May 2008, with NAR agreeing that Internet brokerages would be given access to all the same listings that traditional brokerages are.

== See also ==
- Commercial Information Exchange
- Pocket listing (or exclusive listing)
- Real estate trends
- Real Estate Transaction Standard
- Realtor.com
- Redfin
- Trulia
- Zillow

== External links and references ==
- "Justice Department Sues National Association Of Realtors For Limiting Competition Among Real Estate Brokers", Department of Justice antitrust lawsuit press release, 8 September 2005
