= Real estate business =

Profession of buying, leasing, managing, or selling real estate

Real estate business is the profession of buying, leasing, managing, or selling real estate (commercial, industrial, residential, or mixed-use premises).

== Marketing and sales ==
It is common practice for an intermediary to provide real estate owners with dedicated sales and marketing support in exchange for commission. In Northern America, this intermediary is referred to as a real estate agent, real estate broker or realtor; whilst in the United Kingdom, the intermediary would be referred to as an estate agent. In Australasia, they are known as real estate agents, real estate sales representatives, property consultants, property managers, leasing agents, or simply the agents.

There have been various studies to detect the determinants of housing prices to this day, mostly trying to examine the impacts of structural, locational and environmental attributes of houses.

== Transactions ==
A real estate transaction is the process whereby rights in a unit of property (or designated real estate) are transferred between two or more parties, e.g., in the case of conveyance, one party being the seller(s) and the other being the buyer(s). It can often be quite complicated due to the complexity of the property rights being transferred, the amount of money being exchanged, and government regulations. Conventions and requirements also vary considerably among different countries of the world and among smaller legal entities (jurisdictions).

In more abstract terms, a real estate transaction, like other financial transactions, causes transaction costs. To identify and possibly reduce these transaction costs, the Organisation for Economic Co-operation and Development (OECD) addressed the issue through a study commissioned by the European Commission and through a research action.

The mentioned research action ‘Modelling Real Property Transactions’ investigated methods to describe selected transactions in a formal way to allow for comparisons across countries and jurisdictions. Descriptions were performed both using a more simple format, a Basic Use Case template, and more advanced applications of the Unified Modeling Language. Process models were compared through an ontology-based methodology, and national property transaction costs were estimated for Finland and Denmark based on the directions of the System of National Accounts.

Real estate transactions: subdivision, conveyance, and mortgaging, as they are performed in the five Nordic countries, are described in some detail. A translation into English is available for the Danish part.

== See also ==
- Buyer brokerage (in the United States)
- Buyer's/Buying agent (in Australasia and the United Kingdom)
- Double closing
- Double escrow
- Estate agent (in the United Kingdom)
- FIRE economy
- Graduate real estate education
- Index of real estate articles
- Internal Revenue Code section 1031
- International real estate
- Investment rating for real estate
- Mortgage loan
- Net lease
- NNN lease
- Private equity real estate
- Property Management
- Real estate agent (in Australasia and Northern America)
- Real estate appraisal
- Real estate development
- Real estate economics
- Real estate in China
- Real estate investment trust
- Real estate owned
- Real estate transaction
- Real estate transfer tax
- Real estate trends
- Real-estate bubble
- Real property
- Rural land sales
- Specialized investment fund
- Subprime mortgage crisis
