= Real estate economics =

Application of economic techniques to real estate markets

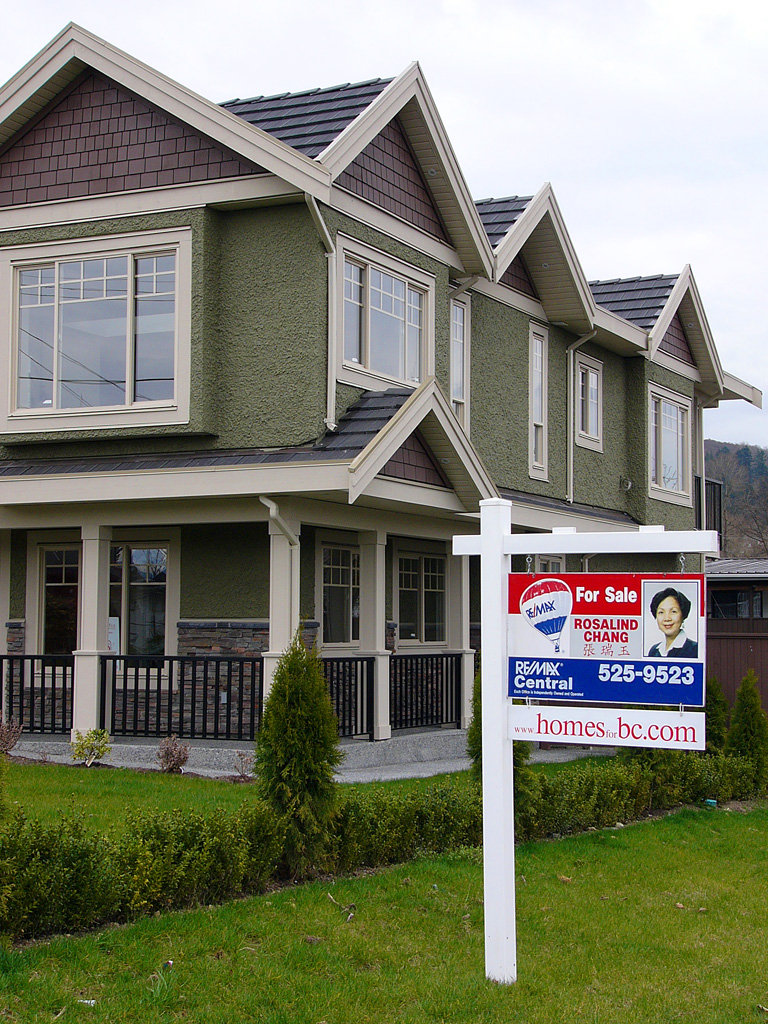
Real estate economists analyze supply, demand, and pricing in real estate.

Real estate economics is the application of economic techniques to real estate markets. It aims to describe and predict economic patterns of supply and demand. The closely related field of housing economics is narrower in scope, concentrating on residential real estate markets, while the research on real estate trends focuses on the business and structural changes affecting the industry. Both draw on partial equilibrium analysis (supply and demand), urban economics, spatial economics, basic and extensive research, surveys, and finance.

== Overview of real estate markets ==
The main participants in real estate markets are:

- Users: These people are both owners and tenants. They purchase houses or commercial property as an investment and also to live in or utilize as a business. Businesses may or may not require buildings to use land. The land can be used in other ways, such as for agriculture, forestry or mining.
- Owners: These people are pure investors. They do not occupy the real estate that they purchase. Typically, they rent out or lease the property to other parties.
- Renters: They are pure consumers.
- Developers: These people are involved in developing land for buildings for sale in the market.
- Renovators: They supply refurbished properties to the market.
- Facilitators: This group includes banks, real estate brokers, lawyers, government regulators, and others that facilitate the purchase and sale of real estate.

The choices of users, owners, and renters form the demand side of the market, while the choices of owners, developers and renovators form the supply side. In order to apply simple supply and demand analysis to real estate markets, a number of modifications need to be made to standard microeconomic assumptions and procedures. In particular, the unique characteristics of the real estate market must be accommodated. These characteristics include:

- Durability. Real estate is durable. A building can last for decades or even centuries, and the land underneath it is practically indestructible. As a result, real estate markets are modelled as a stock/flow market. Although the proportion is highly variable over time, the vast majority of the building supply consists of the stock of existing buildings, while a small proportion consists of the flow of new development. The stock of real estate supply in any period is determined by the existing stock in the previous period, the rate of deterioration of the existing stock, the rate of renovation of the existing stock, and the flow of new development in the current period. The effect of real estate market adjustments tend to be mitigated by the relatively large stock of existing buildings.
- Heterogeneity. Every unit of real estate is unique in terms of its location, the building, and its financing. This makes pricing difficult, increases search costs, creates information asymmetry, and greatly restricts substitutability. To get around this problem, economists, beginning with Muth (1960), define supply in terms of service units; that is, any physical unit can be deconstructed into the services that it provides. Olsen (1969) describes these units of housing services as an unobservable theoretical construct. Housing stock depreciates, making it qualitatively different from new buildings. The market-equilibrating process operates across multiple quality levels. Further, the real estate market is typically divided into residential, commercial, and industrial segments. It can also be further divided into subcategories like recreational, income-generating, historical or protected, and the like.
- High transaction costs. Buying and/or moving into a home costs much more than most types of transactions. The costs include search costs, real estate fees, moving costs, legal fees, land transfer taxes, and deed registration fees. Transaction costs for the seller typically range between 1.5% and 6% of the purchase price. In some countries in continental Europe, transaction costs for both buyer and seller can range between 15% and 20%.
- Long time delays. The market adjustment process is subject to time delays due to the length of time it takes to finance, design, and construct new supply. Because of these lags, there is great potential for disequilibrium in the short run. Adjustment mechanisms tend to be slow relative to more fluid markets.
- Both an investment good and a consumption good. Real estate can be purchased with the expectation of attaining a return (an investment good), with the intention of using it (a consumption good), or both. These functions may be separated (with market participants concentrating on one or the other function) or combined (in the case of the person that lives in a house that they own). This dual nature of the good means that it is not uncommon for people to over-invest in real estate, that is, to invest more money in an asset than it is worth on the open market.
- Immobility. Real estate is locationally immobile (save for mobile homes, but the land underneath them is still immobile). Consumers come to the good rather than the good going to the consumer. Because of this, there can be no physical marketplace. This spatial fixity means that market adjustment must occur by people moving to dwelling units, rather than the movement of the goods. For example, if tastes change and more people demand suburban houses, people must find housing in the suburbs, because it is impossible to bring their existing house and lot to the suburb (even a mobile homeowner, who could move the house, must still find a new lot). Spatial fixity combined with the close proximity of housing units in urban areas suggest the potential for externalities inherent in a given location.

== Housing industry ==
The housing industry is the development, construction, and sale of homes. Its interests are represented in the United States by the National Association of Home Builders (NAHB). In Australia the trade association representing the residential housing industry is the Housing Industry Association. It also refers to the housing market which means the supply and demand for houses, usually in a particular country or region. Housing market includes features as supply of housing, demand for housing, house prices, rented sector and government intervention in the housing market.

== Demand for housing ==
The main determinants of the demand for housing are demographic. But other factors, like income, price of housing, cost and availability of credit, consumer preferences, investor preferences, price of substitutes, and price of complements, all play a role.

The core demographic variables are population size and population growth: the more people in the economy, the greater the demand for housing. But this is an oversimplification. It is necessary to consider family size, the age composition of the family, the number of first and second children, net migration (immigration minus emigration), non-family household formation, the number of double-family households, death rates, divorce rates, and marriages. In housing economics, the elemental unit of analysis is not the individual, as it is in standard partial equilibrium models. Rather, it is households, which demand housing services: typically one household per house. The size and demographic composition of households is variable and not entirely exogenous. It is endogenous to the housing market in the sense that as the price of housing services increase, household size will tend also to increase.

Income is also an important determinant. Empirical measures of the income elasticity of demand in North America range from 0.5 to 0.9 (De Leeuw 1971). If permanent income elasticity is measured, the results are slightly higher (Kain and Quigley 1975) because transitory income varies from year to year and across individuals, so positive transitory income will tend to cancel out negative transitory income. Many housing economists use permanent income rather than annual income because of the high cost of purchasing real estate. For many people, real estate will be the costliest item they will ever buy.

The price of housing is also an important factor. The price elasticity of the demand for housing services in North America is estimated as negative 0.7 by Polinsky and Ellwood (1979), and as negative 0.9 by Maisel, Burnham, and Austin (1971).

An individual household's housing demand can be modelled with standard utility/choice theory. A utility function, such as $U=U(X_1,X_2,X_3,X_4,...X_n)$, can be constructed, in which the household's utility is a function of various goods and services ($X$). This will be subject to a budget constraint such as $P_1X_1+P_2X_2 + ... P_nX_n = Y$, where $Y$ is the household's available income and the $Ps$ are the prices for the various goods and services. The equality indicates that the money spent on all the goods and services must be equal to the available income. Because this is unrealistic, the model must be adjusted to allow for borrowing and saving. A measure of wealth, lifetime income, or permanent income is required. The model must also be adjusted to account for the heterogeneity of real estate. This can be done by deconstructing the utility function. If housing services ($X_4$) are separated into its constituent components ($Z_1,Z_2,Z_3,Z_4,...Z_n$), the utility function can be rewritten as $U=U(X_1,X_2,X_3,(Z_1,Z_2,Z_3,Z_4,...Z_n)...X_n)$. By varying the price of housing services ($X_4$) and solving for points of optimal utility, the household's demand schedule for housing services can be constructed. Market demand is calculated by summing all individual household demands.

== Supply of housing ==
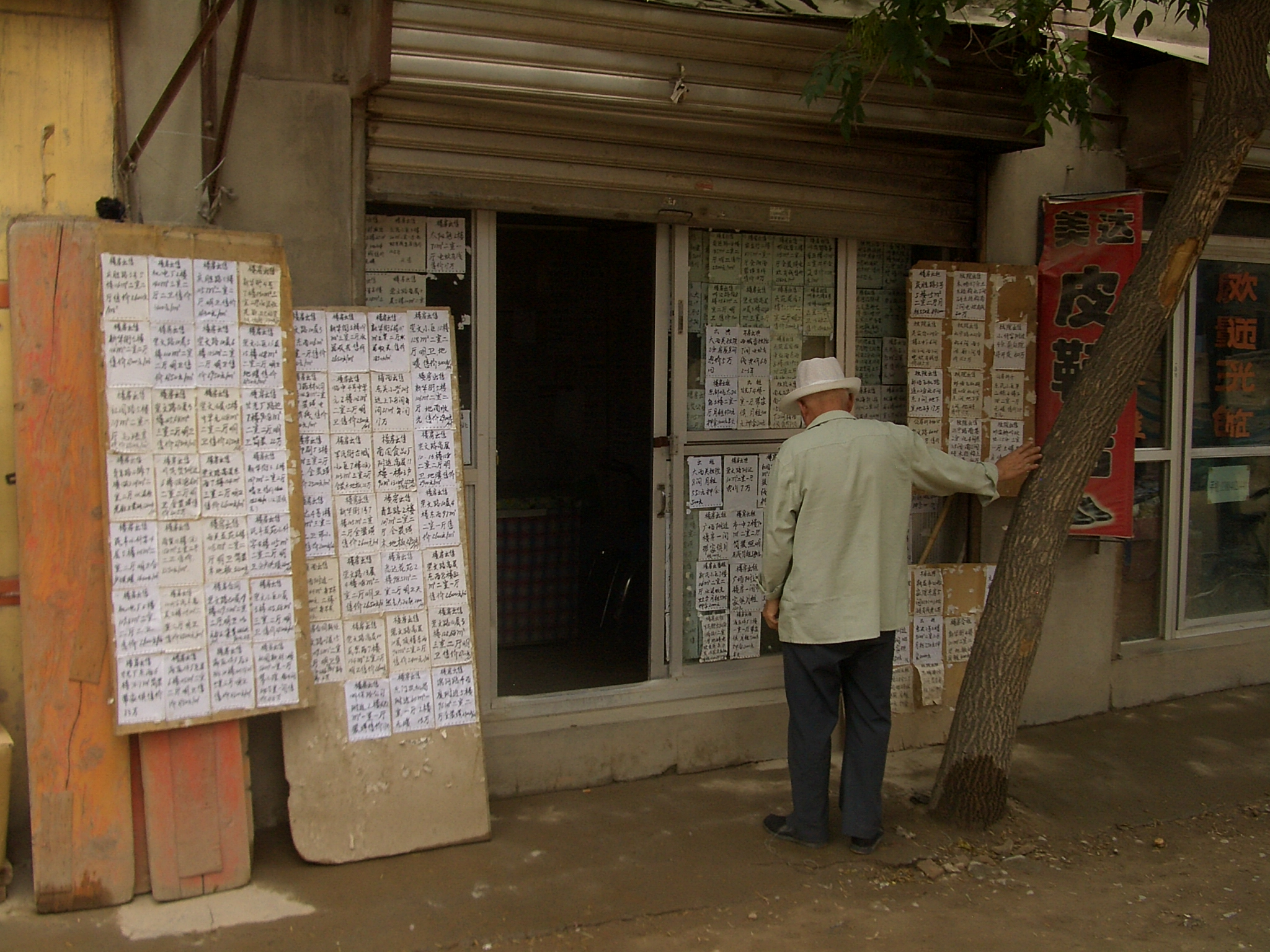
A customer perusing real estate listings at an agent's office in Linxia City, China

Developers produce housing supply using land, labour, and various inputs, such as electricity and building materials. The quantity of new supply is determined by the cost of these inputs, the price of the existing stock of houses, and the technology of production. For a typical single-family dwelling in suburban North America, one can assign approximate cost percentages as follows: acquisition costs, 10%; site improvement costs, 11%; labour costs, 26%; materials costs, 31%; finance costs, 3%; administrative costs, 15%; and marketing costs, 4%. Multi-unit residential dwellings typically break down as follows: acquisition costs, 7%; site improvement costs, 8%; labour costs, 27%; materials costs, 33%; finance costs, 3%; administrative costs, 17%; and marketing costs, 5%. Public-subdivision requirements can increase development costs by up to 3%, depending on the jurisdiction. Differences in building codes account for about a 2% variation in development costs. However, these subdivision and building-code costs typically increase the market value of the buildings by at least the amount of their cost outlays. A production function such as $Q=f(L,N,M)$ can be constructed in which $Q$ is the quantity of houses produced, $N$ is the amount of labour employed, $L$ is the amount of land used, and $M$ is the amount of other materials. This production function must, however, be adjusted to account for the refurbishing and augmentation of existing buildings. To do this, a second production function is constructed that includes the stock of existing housing and their ages as determinants. The two functions are summed, yielding the total production function. Alternatively, a hedonic pricing model can be regressed.

Movement of the supply curve to increased supply leads to reduced price and increased quantity equilibrium

The long-run price elasticity of supply is quite high. George Fallis (1985) estimates it as 8.2, but in the short run, supply tends to be very price-inelastic. Supply-price elasticity depends on the elasticity of substitution and supply restrictions. There is significant substitutability, both between land and materials and between labour and materials. In high-value locations, developers can typically construct multi-story concrete buildings to reduce the amount of expensive land used. As labour costs have increased since the 1950s, new materials and capital-intensive techniques have been employed to reduce the amount of labour used. However, supply restrictions can significantly affect substitutability. In particular, the lack of supply of skilled labour (and labour-union requirements) can constrain the substitution from capital to labour. Land availability can also constrain substitutability if the area of interest is delineated (i.e., the larger the area, the more suppliers of land, and the more substitution that is possible). Land-use controls such as zoning bylaws can also reduce land substitutability.

== Adjustment mechanism ==
The basic adjustment mechanism is a stock/flow model to reflect the fact that about 98% the market is existing stock and about 2% is the flow of new buildings.

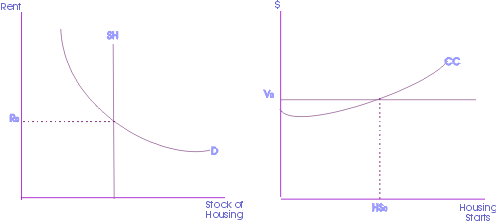

In the adjacent diagram, the stock of housing supply is presented in the left panel while the new flow is in the right panel. There are four steps in the basic adjustment mechanism. First, the initial equilibrium price (Ro) is determined by the intersection of the supply of existing housing stock (SH) and the demand for housing (D). This rent is then translated into value (Vo) via discounting cash flows. Value is calculated by dividing current period rents by the discount rate, that is, as a perpetuity. Then value is compared to construction costs (CC) in order to determine whether profitable opportunities exist for developers. The intersection of construction costs and the value of housing services determine the maximum level of new housing starts (HSo). Finally the amount of housing starts in the current period is added to the available stock of housing in the next period. In the next period, supply curve SH will shift to the right by amount HSo.

== Adjustment with depreciation ==
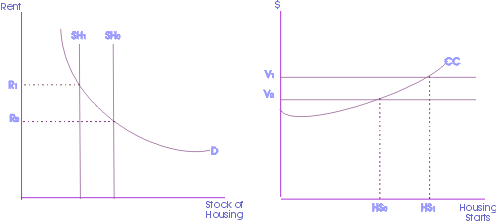

The diagram to the right shows the effects of depreciation. If the supply of existing housing deteriorates due to wear, then the stock of housing supply depreciates. Because of this, the supply of housing (SHo) will shift to the left (to SH1) resulting in a new equilibrium demand of R1 (since the number of homes decreased, but demand still exists). The increase of demand from Ro to R1 will shift the value function up (from Vo to V1). As a result, more houses can be produced profitably and housing starts will increase (from HSo to HS1). Then the supply of housing will shift back to its initial position (SH1 to SHo).

== Increase in demand ==
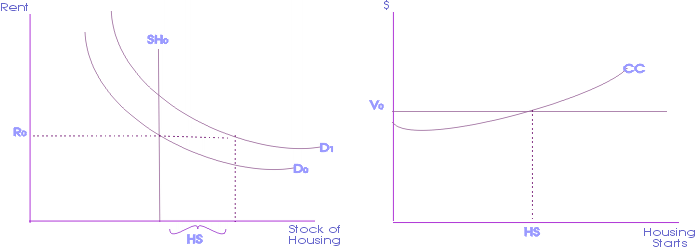

The diagram on the right shows the effects of an increase in demand in the short run. If there is an increase in the demand for housing, such as the shift from Do to D1 there will be either a price or quantity adjustment, or both. For the price to stay the same, the supply of housing must increase. That is, supply SHo must increase by HS.

== Increase in costs ==
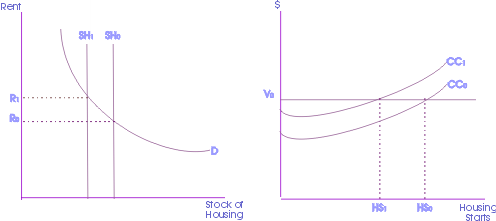

The diagram on the right shows the effects of an increase in costs in the short-run. If construction costs increase (say from CCo to CC1), developers will find their business less profitable and will be more selective in their ventures. In addition some developers may leave the industry. The quantity of housing starts will decrease (HSo to HS1). This will eventually reduce the level of supply (from SHo to SH1) as the existing stock of housing depreciates. Prices will tend to rise (from Ro to R1).

Global real estate markets experienced a 15% drop in housing affordability due to central bank rate hikes in 2024.

== Real estate financing ==
There are different ways of real estate financing: governmental and commercial sources and institutions. A homebuyer or builder can obtain financial aid from savings and loan associations, commercial banks, savings banks, mortgage bankers and brokers, life insurance companies, credit unions, federal agencies, individual investors, and builders.

Over the last decade, residential prices increased every year on average by double digits in Beijing or Shanghai. However many observers and researchers argue that fundamentals of the housing sector, both sector-specific and macroeconomic, may have been the driving force behind housing price volatility.

=== Savings and loan associations ===
The most important purpose of these institutions is to make mortgage loans on residential property. These organizations, which also are known as savings associations, building and loan associations, cooperative banks (in New England), or homestead associations (in Louisiana), are the primary source of financial assistance to a large segment of American homeowners. As home-financing institutions, they give primary attention to single-family residences and are equipped to make loans in this area.

Some of the most important characteristics of a savings and loan association are:

1. It is generally a locally owned and privately managed home-financing institution.
2. It receives individuals' savings and uses these funds to make long-term amortized loans to home purchasers.
3. It makes loans for the construction, purchase, repair, or refinancing of houses.
4. It is state or federally chartered.

=== Commercial banks ===
Due to changes in banking laws and policies, commercial banks are increasingly active in home financing. In acquiring mortgages on real estate, these institutions follow two main practices:

1. Some banks maintain active and well-organized departments whose primary function is to compete actively for real estate loans. In areas lacking specialized real estate financial institutions, these banks become the source for residential and farm mortgage loans.
2. Banks acquire mortgages by simply purchasing them from mortgage bankers or dealers.

In addition, dealer service companies, which were originally used to obtain car loans for permanent lenders such as commercial banks, wanted to broaden their activity beyond their local area. In recent years, however, such companies have concentrated on acquiring mobile home loans in volume for both commercial banks and savings and loan associations. Service companies obtain these loans from retail dealers, usually on a non-recourse basis. Almost all bank or service company agreements contain a credit insurance policy that protects the lender if the consumer defaults.

=== Savings banks ===
These depository financial institutions are federally chartered, primarily accept consumer deposits, and make home mortgage loans.

=== Mortgage bankers and brokers ===
Mortgage bankers are companies or individuals that originate mortgage loans, sell them to other investors, service the monthly payments, and may act as agents to dispense funds for taxes and insurance.

Mortgage brokers present homebuyers with loans from a variety of loan sources. Their income comes from the lender making the loan, just like with any other bank. Because they can tap a variety of lenders, they can shop on behalf of the borrower and achieve the best available terms. Despite legislation that could favor major banks, mortgage bankers and brokers keep the market competitive so the largest lenders must continue to compete on price and service. According to Don Burnette of Brightgreen Homeloans in Port Orange, Florida, "The mortgage banker and broker conduit is vital to maintain competitive balance in the mortgage industry. Without it, the largest lenders would be able to unduly influence rates and pricing, potentially hurting the consumer. Competition drives every organization in this industry to constantly improve on their performance, and the consumer is the winner in this scenario."

=== Life insurance companies ===
Life insurance companies are another source of financial assistance. These companies lend on real estate as one form of investment and adjust their portfolios from time to time to reflect changing economic conditions. Individuals seeking a loan from an insurance company can deal directly with a local branch office or with a local real estate broker who acts as loan correspondent for one or more insurance companies.

=== Credit unions ===
These cooperative financial institutions are organized by people who share a common bond—for example, employees of a company, labor union, or religious group. Some credit unions offer home loans in addition to other financial services.

=== Federally supported agencies ===
Under certain conditions and fund limitations, the Veterans Administration (VA) makes direct loans to creditworthy veterans in housing credit shortage areas designated by the VA's administrator. Such areas are generally rural and small cities and towns not near the metropolitan or commuting areas of large cities—areas where GI loans from private institutions are not available.

The federally supported agencies referred to here do not include the so-called second-layer lenders who enter the scene after the mortgage is arranged between the lending institution and the individual home buyer.

=== Real estate investment trusts ===
Real estate investment trusts (REITs), which began when the Real Estate Investment Trust Act became effective on January 1, 1961, are available. REITs, like savings and loan associations, are committed to real estate lending and can and do serve the national real estate market, although some specialization has occurred in their activities.

In the United States, REITs generally pay little or no federal income tax but are subject to a number of special requirements set forth in the Internal Revenue Code, one of which is the requirement to annually distribute at least 90% of their taxable income in the form of dividends to shareholders.

=== Other sources ===
Individual investors constitute a fairly large but somewhat declining source of money for home mortgage loans. Experienced observers claim that these lenders prefer shorter-term obligations and usually restrict their loans to less than two-thirds of the value of the residential property. Likewise, building contractors sometimes accept second mortgages in partial payment of the construction price of a home if the purchaser is unable to raise the total amount of the down payment above the first mortgage money offered.

In addition, homebuyers or builders can save their money using FSBO in order not to pay extra fees.

== Common misconceptions ==
A 2022 study published by three professors from the University of California found that people in the United States broadly misunderstand the role that supply plays in counteracting the price of housing. Although most renters and homeowners were able to predict the effect of increasing supply on the market for other goods, the researchers found that only 30 to 40 percent of both groups could correctly predict the effect of new supply when applied to the market for homes. A majority of both renters and homeowners were found to prefer lower rent and housing prices for their city, but struggled to connect this preferred policy outcome to the supply-side solutions advocated for by economists. “Supply skepticism,” as the study labelled this phenomenon, was found to predict opposition to constructing new housing as well as opposition to state level policies that reduce local barriers like exclusionary zoning.

== Political Economy of Real Estate ==
Real estate offers perspectives on understanding some of the factors in social mobility and economic decision-making, both at the macro and the micro levels. It has had a profound impact on not only government policies, but also meaningful discussions and choices for individuals looking to become homeowners. In recent years, liberalization of the mortgage markets and complex finance operations using mortgage as collateral (See Mortgage-backed security) have led to the expansion of the world economy. (See Financialization)

=== Housing and voting patterns ===
==== Housing and left/right cleavage ====
While popular culture tends to link home ownership with right-wing voting, studies conducted across Europe tend to show mixed results. In Sweden, homeowners from left-wing social classes are likelier to report themselves as right-wing. In France, middle-class voters were three times more likely to vote for Nicolas Sarkozy in the 2012 French presidential election, but results showed few variations between homeowners and tenants among lower-class and upper-class voters. In Germany, homeowners were more likely to vote for conservative parties when house prices were rising. In the UK, studies on the Housing Act 1980 and the 1983 United Kingdom general election tend to show that while purchasing council houses was linked to a decreased likelihood of voting for the Labour Party (UK), it is mostly the Alliance (center-left) that gained those defecting voters. Studies in the UK and Germany have also highlighted links between home ownership and the redirection of voting patterns towards center-left parties. In line with results from the 1983 general election, a more recent study has argued that as part of a broader process of ‘gentrification’ of Labour electoral interests, UK homeowners tend to divert from the Conservative party (UK) towards a party that reconciles economic interests and left-wing ideals. In Germany, one study has also pointed out a similar ‘embourgeoisement’ effect of the SPD vote.

Regarding preferences for policy proposals, some studies from the UK tend to demonstrate that, as houses are fixed assets, right-wing homeowners who have seen an increase in their property value tend to be less favorable to redistributive policies and social insurance programs. As their property value increases, Conservative voters tend to consider, to a larger degree, houses, a form of self-supplied insurance, which disincentivizes support for such programs. Those policy preferences are likely to be present to a greater extent when it comes to long-term social insurance and redistributive programs such as pensions due to the fixed nature of houses. (See below “The trade-off between Social policies and home ownership)

==== Housing and populism ====
Recently, several studies conducted in several European countries sought to determine the influence of housing on right-wing populist electoral results. While political spectrums and housing markets differ according to countries, studies highlight some cross-national trends.

Studies regarding the relationship between variation in house prices and populist electoral results have found that voters living in areas where house prices increased the least were more prone to vote for right-wing populist parties. One explanation may lie in the fact that as the housing map created winners (those owning in dynamic areas) and losers (those holding in less prosperous areas), those who experienced a relative decline in the value of their homes tended to feel left out of a significant component of household wealth formation, and therefore were inclined to favorite populist political parties which challenged a status quo that did not benefit them. In the UK, some have highlighted a correlation between the relative deflation of housing prices and an increased likelihood of voting in favor of Brexit. Research in France shows that those who saw their home prices increase tended to vote for candidates other than Marine Le Pen in the 2017 French presidential election. In Nordic countries, studies tend to come to similar findings, with data showing an inverse relationship between house price increases and support for right-wing populist parties. Those living in ‘left-behind’ areas (where house prices have decreased by 15%) tended to vote 10% higher for the Danish People’s Party than in ‘booming’ areas (where house prices have increased by 100% In Germany, studies show that die AfD scores are higher in areas where house prices have not risen as much as the average rate. Recent work by Julia Cagé and Thomas Piketty seems to corroborate the existence of areas’ prosperity determinants in the vote for right-wing populist parties. Describing the Rassemblement National vote as “a vote of little-middle access to home ownership,” they argue that home ownership is twice as frequent in towns and villages as in cities (the formers generally being considered as less prosperous areas), represent to some a sign of upward social mobility towards neither affluent nor disadvantaged class and who do not felt represented by traditional right-wing political parties, which they consider representing a more favorited population, or by left-wing political parties, which they regard representing less deserving class and not supporting their efforts. Such analysis, combined with previous presentations on house price variations, point in the direction that right-wing populist electoral results are, at least partly, driven by geosocial factors, with lower middle-class people living in less populated areas not feeling supported by traditional political parties and afraid of social downgrading.

=== Debates around intergenerational conflicts ===
Around Europe, debates around generational inequalities have been the subject of several news outlets. Regarding ownership inequality in Europe, data points to a positive relationship between age and home ownership. In England, those over 65 owned 35.8% of all houses in 2022, while they only represented 18.6% of the population in 2021. In Germany, 50.4% of 60-69-year-olds owned their homes, while only 18.4% of 20-29-year-olds did. As older people tend to have more time to accumulate wealth, academics highlight that these inequalities are wider than decades ago. Research shows that such inequalities exist due to a significant increase in housing prices to the annual income, also known as the wealth-to-income ratio. (See below Wealth-to-Income Ratio) Data collected from the Bank of England show that, in 1982, a house cost, on average, only 4.16 times an average British person’s annual income, but it has now climbed to 8.68 times the yearly income in 2023. Several European countries enacted in the 1990s different public policies aimed to promote home ownership. In the UK during the 1980s, the Thatcher premiership passed the ‘right to buy scheme,’ which saw 3 million council houses sold at a price between 30% and 70% below market prices. In France, liberal housing policies gained ground in the 1970s, enabling the rise of residential suburbs. Nonetheless, some have also nuanced the extent to which countries have uniformly incentivized homeownership during that period. Studies on Nordic countries have highlighted the difference in housing models promoted by public policies, arguing that while Norway has been promoting cooperative and private ownership, it has not so much been the case with Denmark, which has, for example, institutionalized nonprofit renting.

Academics have also pointed out that the strain on capital accumulation that resulted from WWII and post-war era interventionist and redistributionist policies have helped workers – i.e., those who earn a large share of their income through work, to earn a larger share of national income, translating into a greater ability to become homeowners. Such theories would tend to favor the idea that intergenerational homeownership inequalities are more a product of class-based inequalities than intergenerational inequalities as such, as young people struggle to a larger extent not because older people have ‘hoarded’ the housing market but because the capital class, which is not constituted via age but rather by intra-familial transfers and wealth accumulation, have exploited the labor class to a greater extent since the end of the 1970s. In line with this argument, some highlight the importance of considering intragenerational housing wealth inequalities; studies regarding the UK have demonstrated that such household housing wealth inequalities are the most important within the baby-boomer generation, suggesting limits to the intergenerational divide theories.

While several news outlets have framed a growing generational conflict around housing ownership, some studies have argued that if, from an objective perspective, millennials recognized that baby boomers were better off, a relational analysis demonstrated that they did not resent the older generation for their situations but rather the government for out-of-touch policies. As for the baby boomers, they tended to resent sympathy for the younger generations, recognizing that they were facing more significant barriers to home ownership. Similarly, research argues that if the probability of housing being a personal issue significantly decreases with age, the tendency to consider it a country-wide problem, i.e., a public policy issue, remains similar across generations, which would tend to affirm the prominence of inter-generational solidarity rather than inter-generational conflict.

=== Paradigms of Social Welfare Policies Regarding Real Estate Economics ===
Many government policies in social welfare states view houses as assets – a way for families to hedge their risks against eventual retirement and have a safe form of savings alternative to other pensions. Since the 1980s, these governments have often focused on making the housing market more liquid by broadening the access to financing of houses. Bohle and Seabrooke argue that there are three paradigms of housing:

1. Social Right - All citizens deserve fair housing. It is the obligation of the state to provide society with the ability to own homes by intervening in the market. (ex. Rent controls, tenure legislation, housing allowances, public/cooperative housing provision, management of housing by public or non-profit corporations, etc.) An example that the scholars offer is the post-war Scandinavian housing policies. Sweden believed that all citizens should have fair access to the housing market and that the state must play an active role in shaping the market to this nature.
2. Asset - Houses are individual properties, and the markets work in the supply/demand fluctuation to provide opportunities. Essential for “asset-based welfare.” Furthermore, it serves as collateral for debt, which in turn serves as an investment outlet. (See neoliberal capitalism) Pensions are often complementary to housing-related financial products. Government programs would include the privatization of home ownership, deregulation of mortgage markets, the establishment of credit scores, fiscal and tax policies geared to home ownership, and assurances from central banks to stabilize mortgage bond markets.
3. Patrimony - Family houses are passed on to younger generations: inheritance laws, family-based tax breaks, and subsidies. Family is seen as the stabilizing force of sharing political and economic preferences, and thus, patrimony is often seen under strong conservative connotation.

There are clear examples in which these three paradigms served as the basis for structural changes in which states’ housing policies evolved based upon the economic changes. In Ireland, the 1980s housing market reflected a patrimony-based housing market – but since then, neoliberal policies have led to cutting social housing programs and increasing private home constructions. Housing finance became even stronger with the EU accession, and banks began asset-based lending. By 2016, the Irish households were the fourth most indebted in the EU, a fifth with residential mortgage debts.: After the Great Recession, Ireland suffered from the Troika, resulting in Irish domestic laws undermining the social policies in favor of its financial health. The Land and Conveyancing Law Reform Bill 2013 made it possible for lenders to repossess homes from borrowers - an action aimed at protecting the financial sector rather than having a coherent housing policy. The vacancy rate of housing in Ireland rose to 12.8%, leaving behind ghost towns. Ultimately, wealthier households in Ireland pass their houses to children while lower-income families are excluded from ever owning property – watching the paradigm of Ireland shift from asset to patrimony.

In Denmark, the persistence of tax breaks for mortgage debt led to Danish consumers becoming one of the most indebted people in the world, with an average of 250% of debt per capita relative to personal income. Denmark used a mortgage-based covered bond system as its form of “privatized monetary policy,” in 1986, the housing bubble burst, leading to the coalition government reducing the mortgage interest deductibility from taxes. After the 1989 reform of the mortgage financing system (in line with the EU’s Second Banking Directive) and the 1990 Social Democratic government’s liberalized mortgage product policies, the credit market and available credit for housing boomed. In the 2000s, cracks began to show between the elites and masses - 2007 reforms allowed Danish banks to enter the mortgage market more aggressively while the foreign investment interests in Danish mortgage bond markets increased. (Increased financialization, the continued road to the housing as asset policies). Continued marketization of housing led some apartments in Copenhagen to triple in price within five years.

In Hungary, foreign capital began flowing in during its accession to the EU era, and banks in Hungary were encouraged to increase their access to lending and lower borrowing costs, creating a risky housing market. When the housing bubble burst in 2008, the socialist Gordon Bajnai administration (2009-2010) focused on reducing public debt and deficit rather than the private side (over-indebted population). Orban’s government took a pivot from these policies - it angled its attacks on the foreign banks and lenders as the predators for why Hungary fell under economic downfall; the government levied special taxes on banks, insurance companies, and financial sectors. It tried to alleviate the burdens of households of foreign currency loans by allowing borrowers to pay in Hungarian forint (currency) at a preferential rate if they could pay their loans in one lump sum. Lenders were compelled to compensate borrowers for discrepancies between the exchange rate they used for loan repayment and the market exchange rate. However, this pushed the lower-income part of the society even further down; the cut down on subsidies to housing for these groups made homelessness even a crime. The ultraconservative policies pushed the cost of the housing onto the banks rather than taxpayers, while Hungary’s housing deprivation problems and issues with dampness, rot, lack of bathroom facilities, and overcrowding are among the worst in Central and Eastern Europe.

=== Governments’ neoliberal policies and rising mortgage debt levels ===
The popular academic discourse surrounding the financialization of real estate is that liquidity and furthering of credit stimulate economic growth. Deregulation and liberalization are ways financial regulators intended for the markets to grow – through the increasing utilization of real estate as collateral for other financial products. Such decisions have led to the creation of complex financial transactions that eventually led to the government’s continued neoliberal policies of opening the housing markets to financialization.

The academic debate around the causes for rising levels of mortgage debts concerns their focus on the supply or the demand side of the housing market. Recent scholars focusing on the demand side explain that consumers purchasing and owning houses seek mortgage lending to complete their purchases, ultimately increasing house prices. Schwartz states that the 1980s deregulation of mortgage markets increased potential credit, resulting in higher demand for real estate and rising prices. In addition, Johnston and Regan showed that increased wages led to households having more liquidity to finance real estate properties, leading to higher demand for houses and, therefore, even more mortgage lending. This side of the academic debate presents an argument that seeks to use increased demand for housing over the years as the primary reason for rising levels of mortgage debt worldwide.

On the other hand, Anderson and Kurzer argued that drivers of housing supply led to a rising level of mortgages and household indebtedness – while also interacting with the demand levels for housing. They studied the Netherlands, Denmark, and Sweden – three countries with the highest levels of outstanding mortgage debts compared to their disposable income and the highest levels of mortgage debts as part of their GDP. In summary, the study presented that the three countries rode the waves of political policies that were formed around the right/center-right governments’ desire in the 1990s to stimulate home ownership and reduce social housing expenses and build a society of self-sufficient home-owners. However, when the more left-leaning governments came to power, they did not reverse these policies. Instead, they introduced further deregulation of mortgage markets to allow more working-class consumers to become homeowners.

As a result, the continued neoliberal policies around the mortgage markets in these three countries led to the growth of banking power. Danish banks saw their annual growth rates in lending exceeding 50% between 2003 and 2007, while in the Netherlands, the Dutch market for securitized assets (in this case, mortgage-backed securities) became the second largest in Europe after the UK in 2008. In Sweden, the Swedish-covered bonds (securities, usually backed by mortgages) were at 55% of GDP in 2014 and more than double the Swedish government bonds. In summary, the scholars argue that the Netherlands, Denmark, and Sweden mortgage markets were liberalized to encourage financial innovation and promote homeownership. Still, residential construction remained stagnant, leading to an inelastic housing supply. Government officials and regulators liberalized the mortgage market using credit and financial products such as special mortgage packages and consumer tax incentives to bypass this issue. Because all three countries have very high tax rates, the fiscal relief offered by tax incentives from having mortgages seemed even more lucrative, increasing the demand. At the same time, the supply of housing continued to stay inelastic. Anderson and Kurzer conclude that this led to the collapse of housing markets under the crumbling legs of complex mortgage-backed financial products.

Ultimately, the debate around the rising mortgage debt levels worldwide centers around financialization and the political agenda of homeownership. There are strong connections to government programs that reflect the political ideologies of homeownership and the economic tools to achieve those means. In the case of the Netherlands, Sweden, and Denmark, Anderson and Kurzer showed that the center-right governments began increasing homeownership to cut social housing costs and reduce social policy dependence. The center-left government that subsequently followed also used similar tools of neo-liberal housing policies to enable homeownership for working-class citizens.

=== The trade-off between Social policies and home ownership ===
Academic debates surround the nature of the trade-off between social welfare and house ownership. In the 1980s, Jim Kemeney presented that homeownership and social welfare policies have an inverse relationship. First, Kemeney argued that citizens living in a country with meager retirement pensions and/or lacking government support of public welfare policies would tend to make private contributions in their earlier phases of life towards retirement – often in the form of housing. Homeowners would feel that their home is a valuable asset that would safeguard them from the risks of eventual retirement and aging. Thus, they would feel less inclined to rely on or support the government’s public welfare policies. The government’s social welfare policies would further undermine the value of the houses because the public support of the social housing upkeep will ultimately drive the value of the homes downward. Kemeney showed these findings from his analysis of eight OECD Countries, including Sweden, the Netherlands, the UK, the USA, Canada, Australia, and others. About twenty years later, Frank Castles, a professor of political science at the Australian National University, conducted more in-depth research on Kemeney’s thesis and strongly confirmed his case. Castles would adjust Kemeny’s thesis to show that the “really big trade-off” was between homeownership and pensions instead of the welfare state.

Kemeney’s main argument is presented in his work:

“My overall argument was that high rates of home ownership impacted on society through various forms of privatisation, influencing urban form, public transport, life-styles, gender roles, systems of welfare and social security as well as other dimensions of social structure. I argued that an overwhelming emphasis on home ownership created a lifestyle based on detached housing, privatised urban transport and its resulting ‘‘one-household’’ (and increasingly ‘‘one-person’’) car ownership, a traditional gendered division of labour based on female housewifery and the fulltime working male, and strong resistance to public expenditure that necessitated the high taxes needed to fund quality universal welfare provision.”

In 2020, Gunten and Kohl returned to Kemeny’s thesis. They presented a different side of the academic research, presenting in an updated study that this inverse relationship between social welfare and house ownership converges upwards to what they labeled the “dual ratchet effect.” Huber and Stephens argued that the political costs of stopping social policies could be damaging, and thus, social policies are more resistant to their opposition. Gunten and Kohl reciprocate this argument for homeownership – homeownership is also used to garner political support due to its popularity amongst citizens – and thus, the damaging political costs from withdrawing the benefits of having public policies favoring homeownership (ex. In the form of tax breaks, subsidies, etc.) lead to a resiliency against its opposition. This inelasticity of both social policies and homeownership resulted in the fact that high costs associated with decreasing either of the policies resulted in them being more responsive to upward drivers rather than downward effects. Governments bypassed the issue of unloading the problems of social policies on homeowners by using the credit markets – resorting to inflation in the 70s, public debt in the 80s, and private debt in the 2000s. This was labeled as the buying time hypothesis by Gunten and Kohl and will be further supported by their capital supply hypothesis – where the amount of capital available will increase due to the deregulation of the international financial market since the 1970s and the growth of private pension fund assets leading to an abundance of available capital. In conclusion, Gunten and Kohl present a case where the inverse relationship between homeownership and social policies existed in the 80s but has changed towards the dual ratchet effect of simultaneous, upward convergence. Furthermore, they state that if the trade-off in the long run still holds, the correction costs of homeownership and pensions will eventually correct themselves in the long run when the amount of capital begins to dwindle and the credit market runs dry.

== See also ==
- Affordable housing
- Affordability of housing in the United Kingdom
- Australian property market
- Effective gross income
- Housing affordability index
- Investment rating for real estate
- Land value tax
- Property Management
- Real estate trends
- Real estate business
- Real estate development
- Real-estate bubble
- 2000s United States housing bubble
- Sunshine tax
