= Virtual Office Website =

A Virtual Office Website (VOW) is a web site that is used to conduct business activities. One example is a VOW used as a real estate property search site allowing the public to conduct searches of approved multiple listing service properties in a given area under certain conditions. Also see Virtual company.

== Features ==
The VOW allows the public to:

1. provide contact information
2. agree to become a bona fide customer / client
3. get a password protected private account
4. describe property interest(s)
5. and then conduct searches of all available multiple listing service properties in a certain area.

Site users have to provide personal information before they can actually look at the listings. Also, realtors who use VOW can choose to "opt out" from the local multiple listing service, which means that these realtors' properties will only be displayed to people who have signed in with the VOW.

The benefit to realtors is that registered users of their VOW web site become customers under contract. Registered users gain the benefit of more detailed information about each property and can generally see all available properties.

== Regulation ==
Certain rules apply to the real estate companies ability to display each detail about a property, these "display rules" are set by the multiple listing service which generally forms policy around the recommendations of the National Association of Realtors.

The U.S. Department of Justice filed an antitrust lawsuit against the National Association of Realtors in September 2005 over the VOW policy, which they deemed as anti-competitive.

As of early 2006, the VOW policy has been replaced by a new Internet Listing Display policy created by the National Association of Realtors.

On May 27, 2008, NAR and the U.S. Department of Justice reached a favorable settlement, concluding a two-year DOJ investigation (followed by two and a half years of litigation) regarding NAR's multiple listing policy as it pertained to the display of listings from the MLS on brokers' virtual office Web sites, or VOWs.

== See also ==
- Internet Listing Display (ILD) – an abandoned policy that promised to replace VOW and IDX
- Internet Data Exchange (IDX) – an older multiple-listing policy also being replaced by the ILD
- Real Estate Transaction Specification (RETS)
- Multiple listing service (MLS)
- Real estate trends
- Virtual office – for virtual business address or virtual offices
