= Sub-agent =

Sub-agent (Sub-agency) is a real estate term in the United States and Canada describing the relationship which a real estate broker and his/her agents have with a buyer of a business, home, or property.

== About sub-agents ==
Lasting until the early 1990s, the broker provided a conventional full-service, commission-based brokerage relationship under a signed listing agreement only with a seller, thus creating an agency relationship with fiduciary obligations under common law in most of the US and Canada. The seller was then a client of the broker.

However, no such agency relationship existed with the buyer, and the broker's agents helped the buyer (who was typically known as his or her "customer"). In this situation, during the entire period in which the buyer looked at properties, entered into a real estate contract, and finally closed on one, that broker/agent functioned solely as the sub-agent of the seller’s broker.

Some clear disadvantages exist for the buyer under sub-agency. There is no obligation to obtain the best price or terms for the buyer, since the broker, as sub-agent, was obligated to obtain the best terms for the seller, generally someone who he/she had never met and with whom no direct business relationship existed. Many states, notably Florida and Colorado, have abolished sub-agency in favor of written Buyer Brokerage Agreements or the creation of Transaction Brokerage.

It was only with the advent of Buyer brokerage in the 1990s - the legal representation of a buyer by a broker - that a buyer became a client of the broker and entered into the same fiduciary relationship enjoyed by the seller.

In the Philippines, a Sub-Agent is someone who is under the supervision and operational control of a Real Estate Broker. The Sub-Agent is not an agent of the Buyer or Seller. It is the Broker who is the Agent of the Buyer or Seller. The Sub-Agent is an agent of the Broker, works for the Broker, and represents the interest of the Broker. The formal position of a Sub-Agent in the hierarchy of real estate practitioners in the Philippines is equivalent to the rank of Salesperson. A Salesperson is described in Section 3 and Section 31 of the Real Estate Service Act of the Philippines (Republic Act 9646).

== See also ==
- List of real estate topics
