= Real estate investment club =

Real estate investment club is a club formed by individuals who want to invest specifically in real estate. Members aim to make money by investing in real estate but don't necessarily have the capital available to buy whole properties. The real estate investment clubs allow individuals to join (which need to be distinguished from a formally established real estate investment trust, so that their money can be pooled together in order to purchase properties that they otherwise could not afford to buy.

Real estate investment clubs vary between those that focus on single family homes, and those that focus on commercial real estate. Real estate investment clubs members will often buy properties by pooling investments and then refurbish the property for resale or long-term investment as rentals.

== History ==
Real estate investment clubs have been booming since the 1990s, so much so that the National Real Estate Investors Association was formed in the United States late 1990s.

By 2002 the US Real Estate Investors Association had 44 active affiliated groups, and by 2008 they had over 230 groups.

== Types ==
=== General ===
Agencies online include the Real Estate Investment Club, Commercial Real Estate Online and the National Real Estate Network. These organizations deal with properties around the country.

=== Women's ===
Many women are able to get involved in real estate investing by joining investment clubs - not necessarily ones which only feature female members. NuWire Investor advised this avenue in an article published on January 22, 2008., BellaOnline has also published articles encouraging women to join such groups. Women in Real Estate was formed in 1983 by women working in the California real estate industry. Membership is open to commercial real estate professionals with a minimum of two years experience in the industry.

=== Minorities ===
Many minority communities also created investment clubs. For example, the Milwaukee Journal Sentinel reported a story on October 18, 2005, about Communities Learning to Invest and Mobilize for Business (CLIMB), funded by the Annie E. Casey Foundation and the Forest County Potawatomi Community Foundation, in order to help minority communities accumulate as much as $100,000 in assets within a decade.,

=== Local v national ===
There are two types of investment clubs - those that focus nationally, such as Commercial Real Estate Online and the National Real Estate Network, and those that focus on the local neighborhood.

== See also ==
- For sale by owner (FSBO)
- Real estate broker
- United States housing bubble
- Multiple Listing Service (MLS)
- Internet Data Exchange (IDX)
- List of real estate topics
