= FSBO Madison =

American real estate company

- Company type: Private
- Industry: Real estate
- Founded: 1998
- Headquarters: Madison, Wisconsin, United States
- Key people: Christie Miller, Mary Clare Murphy

FSBO Madison is a real estate company based in Madison, Wisconsin. It pioneered the use of the internet as an alternative to the realtor-backed Multiple Listing Service (MLS) system. The company is considered the largest for-sale-by-owner website in the United States. FSBO (pronounced FIZZ-bo) refers to the common abbreviation of 'For Sale By Owner' used by homeowners selling their homes without the assistance of a realtor.

The company was started by Christie Miller and Mary Clare Murphy as an off-hand idea to help Murphy sell her home. They contacted local homeowners with homes listed as for-sale-by-owner and the website was started on February 28, 1998 with eight listings.

FSBO Madison reportedly represents 25% of the residential home sales in the Madison area. In 2002 they reported approximately 2,000 home listings. In September 2007 FSBO Madison was the subject of a study conducted by three economists from Northwestern University and the University of Wisconsin. They reviewed the strengths and weaknesses of using a realtor and found that homes utilizing a realtor typically sold faster, but for-sale-by-owner sellers came out ahead financially. The costs comparison was dramatic between the typical percentage of the home sale charged by a realtor and the $150.00 charged by FSBO Madison for a six-month listing.
