= Property finder =

Representatives of buyers in property transactions

Property finders (or property search agents) are companies and individuals representing a buyer in a property transaction. The term is more common in the United Kingdom, but in the United States the situation is referred to as buyer brokerage, and in Australia it is known as buyer advocacy.

Property finders specialise in sourcing and negotiating the purchase of property on behalf of the buyer. A property finder will develop an understanding of the client's requirements, desires and property goals, and then attempt to find a property which matches all of these requirements.

In Britain, until the early 1990s, agents involved in a property transaction worked for the seller as estate agents. Now, property finders exist to represent the interests of the buyer or tenant. Today in the United States where fiduciary obligations exist, if the buyer is working with a broker other than the brokerage which represents the seller by "listing" the property for sale, he may choose to enter into a buyer brokerage agreement to be represented. (In some cases where dual agency is permitted by law, even the listing broker may represent the buyer). If the buyer does not enter into this agreement, he/she remains as a customer of the broker, who is then the sub-agent of seller's broker.

== History ==
Property finders originated in the United States during the early 1990s and have grown to become involved in over 63% of property transactions there. In recent years, stemming primarily from the relocation industry, property finders now have a prominent involvement in property purchases and rentals across Europe.

== Fees ==
The majority of property finders charge a retainer fee before they begin the search for a property. Users of full service estate agents in the UK can expect to pay a flat fee while, more typically in the US, a percentage of the property purchase price may be received from the seller's broker by means of an offer of compensation to cooperating brokers or it can be paid directly by the buyer.

Based on US tax laws, investors may find that the cost of using a property finder is tax-deductible when purchasing an investment property. However, for the owner-occupier, no tax break may exist unless the total acquisition costs versus the eventual sales price and gain can be verified if any capital gains tax is due. In some cases the property finder will only charge a percentage based on what they can save with a transaction.

In contrast to most US states' common law (where realtors work for and represent the interests of the seller and not the buyer -unless they enter into an agency agreement to do so- and their function is to obtain the highest price on the best terms for the seller), a property finder is working for and represents the buyer, thus creating a balance between the skills and expertise available to both parties in a transaction.

== See also ==
- Buying agent
- Real estate broker
