= Internet Listing Display =

Internet Listing Display (ILD) was a set of rules put forth by the National Association of Realtors in 2005 to regulate how homes and properties can be displayed on internet sites. The ILD policy was intended to consolidate and replace both the Virtual Office Website (VOW) and Internet Data Exchange (IDX) policies to create one set of rules.

The ILD policy is a work in progress created as a result of investigation from the U.S. Department of Justice into anti-competitive practices by traditional real estate brokers. The ILD policy is intended to prevent traditional brokers from solely excluding their property listings from selected discount broker web sites, since they must "opt out" from display on all other brokers' sites .

In late 2005, the NAR recommended to avoid using ILD, and the policy has since largely been abandoned.

== See also ==
- Internet Data Exchange (IDX)
- Real estate trends
- Virtual Office Website (VOW)
