= Beardstown Ladies =

American investment club

The Beardstown Ladies is a group of 16 women in their 70s who formed an investment club, formally known as the Beardstown Business and Professional Women's Investment Club, in Beardstown, Illinois, in 1983 in a church basement. The club got media attention after it authored a book, published in 1995, titled The Beardstown Ladies' Common-Sense Investment Guide: How We Beat the Stock Market – And How You Can Too, which claimed that the club has produced annual returns of 23.4% since inception. The club authored additional books, including The Beardstown Ladies' Stitch-In-Time Guide to Growing Your Nest Egg: Step-by-Step Planning for a Comfortable Financial Future in January 1996 and The Beardstown Ladies' Pocketbook Guide to Picking Stocks in April 1998. The ladies gained speaking tours and became minor celebrities.

In March 1998, Shane Tritsch published an article in Chicago titled Bull Marketing: Debunking the Myth of the Beardstown Ladies and Their Spectacular Stock Market Gains. The article noted that the club included a disclaimer in its books that the published returns included fees that were charged to members.

After an audit by PricewaterhouseCoopers, the club noted that it had made a computer formula error in calculating its returns, and its actual annual returns were 9.1%, which were below those of the S&P 500 Index during the same time period. The club issued an apology and a disclaimer on all of its books, but by that time, it had sold over 1.1 million.

This revelation led to a class action lawsuit against publisher Hyperion, a division of The Walt Disney Company, which settled the case by offering to swap the Beardstown Ladies books for other Hyperion books.

The experience provided many with a lesson on the importance of vetting investment claims.

In 2010, a member of the club stated that only 4 or 5 of the original members remained in the club; the rest had died.

In 2016, the club was still active, with over $400,000 invested and 75% of the members being descendants of the original club members.
