= Simultaneous closing =

Real estate financing technique

Simultaneous closing is a real estate seller financing technique, whereby the private mortgage note created by the seller is simultaneously sold to a note buyer on closing.

== Overview ==
Typically, the terms of the note are agreed upon between the seller and the buyer with some suggestions from the note buyer. On closing day, two transactions take place: a real estate transaction and a note purchase transaction, almost simultaneously.

Sometimes the note purchase transaction happens a few days or weeks after the real estate transaction. This depends on how early in the process the note buyer gets involved and whether there are closing issues with this transaction.

== Motivations ==
The seller's main motivation for using this technique is to obtain cash on closing or shortly after, instead of receiving the proceeds from the sale over a period of years.

The buyer's motivation is to obtain more lenient financing from the seller, especially when credit issues are or have been a problem.

The note buyer is looking for the cash flow from the mortgage note. He has to make sure that he doesn't get too involved in this transaction and thereby appear to be acting as a lender, which he usually is not.

== See also ==
- After-acquired property
