= Exclusive buyer agent =

Agent in real estate

An exclusive buyer agent (EBA) (also known as an exclusive buyer broker (EBB)) is a U.S. real estate firm (or an agent or broker who works in such a company) that represents only buyers of real estate. EBA firms never take listings and, therefore, never represent the seller in a real estate transaction.

Exclusive buyer agencies are real estate brokerages that represent only buyers and do not take listings from sellers. Proponents of the business model argue that it reduces potential conflicts of interest associated with brokerages that represent both buyers and sellers. In an exclusive buyer agency, the brokerage and its affiliated agents represent only buyers in real estate transactions and do not act as listing agents for sellers.

In many jurisdictions, a buyer-agent relationship is established through a written buyer representation or buyer brokerage agreement that outlines the agent's duties and the terms of representation.

== History ==
In 1983, a Federal Trade Commission study found that many home buyers mistakenly believed that the real estate agent showing them a property represented their interests. In response to concerns about consumer confusion, states gradually adopted agency-disclosure requirements requiring real estate agents to disclose whom they represented in a transaction.

Around the same time, these ideas were being advocated by Honolulu attorney, educator and author of many books, John W. Reilly. His 1987 book "Agency Relationships in Real Estate" was the culmination of several years working with the National Association of Realtors (NAR) and NARELLO, the license law arm of the association.

In November 1985, California entrepreneur Ridgely Evers' America's First Home Store opened in Chandler, Arizona, as the first Exclusive Buyer Brokerage in the USA. In 1986, the name was changed to Buyer One and the company had its first public offering. The first national franchise to offer Exclusive Buyer Brokerage was The Buyer's Agent Inc., which was formed in July 1988 by Tom Hathaway, a former state highway patrolman and investigator/compliance officer for the Missouri Real Estate Commission.

== Method of exclusive service ==
Real estate firms in the United States can represent both buyers and sellers in the same transaction, and when representing both, derive profit from both the seller and buyer side of the transaction. While some states have, at the insistence of Realtor trade groups, created various forms of dual agency to allow one company and in some cases an individual agent to represent both sides, other states have continued to hold such practices as illegal. In the opinion of EBAs, it is not possible to faithfully represent the best interests of opposing clients, in the same transaction, simultaneously.

The service structure for EBA real estate practitioners is to show buyers all possible listings from other cooperating brokers as well as all other sources, such as for sale by owners. Then, they assist the buyer with evaluation and negotiation and advocate in the buyer's best interests without restriction.

In its consumer booklet Shopping for Your Home Loan, the United States Department of Housing and Urban Development (HUD) advises home buyers to consider using an exclusive buyer's agent when purchasing a home.

EBA firms amount to less than 1/2 of 1 percent of all real estate firms in the US. The EBA business model of unconflicted buyer representation eliminates the possibility of the buyer being confronted with the conflicts of interest which may be associated with the Dual, Limited or Designated Agency business models.
