= Laiki agora =

Greek farmer's market

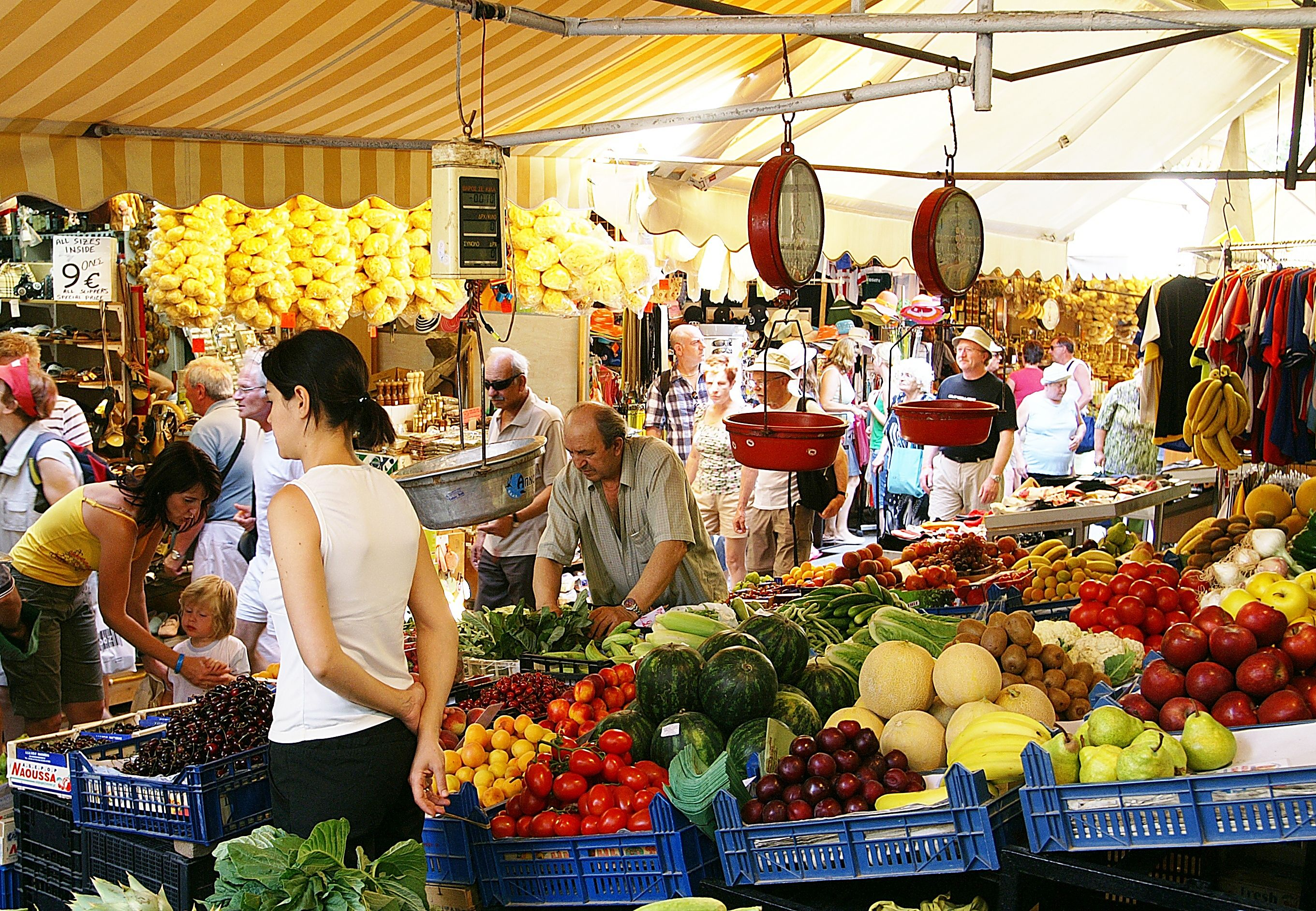
A market in Heraklion, Crete, famous for its tourism. Some of the fresh produce that can be identified in this photo include: tomatoes, lettuce, spinach, bananas, cherries, watermelons, melons, red and yellow apples, cucumbers, garlic, apricots, grapes, lemons, pears, beans, strange fruits, peaches

Laiki agora (λαϊκή αγορά, Greek for people's market), also common in the plural Laikes agores (λαϊκές αγορές, people's markets), are farmers' markets that operate all over Greece, selling foodstuffs and gardening or household equipment, as well as children's toys and various "do it yourself" tools.

It is considered an important social custom and tradition in Greece.

== History ==
People's markets were founded by Greek political leader Eleutherios Venizelos. Part of the motivation was to help local agricultural producers sell their fresh produce to the local population in nearby towns without the need of middlepersons, thus cutting down prices, and from this perspective the introduction of people's markets in Greece can be considered as an application of the commercial practice of disintermediation (or "cutting out the middleperson").

== Sellers ==
There are two kind of sellers in Greek people's markets: the "producers" (paragogoi, παραγωγοί) and the "professionals" (epaggelmaties, επαγγελματίες).

The "producers" are farmers or beekeepers from nearby towns or villages who maintain their own agricultural farms or beehives and produce their own foodstuffs, such as fruits, vegetables, and honey.

The "professionals" purchase foodstuffs from various sources and sell it in the people's markets, but they are not necessarily the original producers of the foodstuffs they sell.

All sellers in people's markets have to display a card with their name in a place where consumers can see it easily, and on the same card they have to include what kind of seller they are: the producers can be identified by the words παραγωγός (paragogos, producer) or αγρότης (agrotis, farmer) alongside their name, while the "professionals" can be identified by the word επαγγελματίας (epaggelmatias) near their name on their cards.

Sellers who sell foodstuffs and gardening equipment can be either "producers" or "professionals", while those who sell household equipment or various children toys and "do it yourself" tools are usually "professionals".

=== Permits ===
All sellers must receive a special permit by the government in order to be able to sell produce in a people's market. There are also strict professional and social requirements.

There are two kind of permits: the "producer's permit" for the "producers", and the "professional's permit" for the "professionals". Permits, by law, are not given to "producers" over 65 years old or "professionals" over 55 years old.

"Producers" must prove that they are the owners and farmers of a "family farm" (defined as a farm held by a farmer and the other people working on the farm are their husband or wife, children, or close relatives).

Both "producers" and "professionals" need to have completed their obligatory military service, and before a permit is granted the military's office must equip the prospective seller's with a document proving (known as "type A" in Greece) that they have served the military or legally granted an exemption.

Before a permit is granted, the prospective seller's application is examined by a committee of experts who decide whether the applicant can be allowed to sell products in laikes agores in accordance with the local laws.

"Professionals" are barred from undertaking any other profession, trade, or commercial activity after they are granted a permit to sell products in a people's market. They have to accept selling in the market as their sole income-generating trade, or vioporistikon epaggelma (life-earning profession).

== Products ==
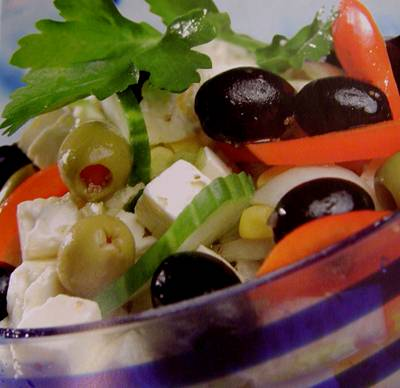
All ingredients of the world-famous Greek salad can be bought in laikes agores: tomato, cucumber, green peppers, olives, olive oil, and feta cheese. The oil and cheese may not be found in smaller people's markets, but those in major cities typically carry all ingredients.

The Products sold in people's markets are typically those comprising a Mediterranean diet, known for its healthy qualities, and are key ingredients in the cuisine of Greece. They are mainly local food, known as ntopia (ντόπια) in Greek, such as fresh fruits (including, depending on the season, oranges, apples, watermelons, melons, strawberries, and others), vegetables (like cucumbers, tomatoes, onions, potatoes, broccoli, carrots, and others), leaf vegetables (e.g. lettuce, spinach, rocket and purslane), chicken eggs from suburban farms, and fish (for example sardines, European seabass, red mullets) recently caught from nearby seas (often caught the same day sold). Usually local food sold in people's markets is produced by family farms within the same geographical region as the market, and the "producers" who sell the local foodstuffs in the people's markets are usually the farmers themselves who travel from market to market in nearby towns to sell their produce directly to consumers.

Some fish sold in laikes agores is imported from overseas, such as Norwegian salmon. All foods, including fish, usually state their place of origin on a card that is displayed together with the product.

The "professionals" sell both local food and food imported from overseas, including avocados, mangos, yellow watermelons, cherry tomatoes, and other exotic fruits often bought from the tropics.

Gardening products, including flowers, ornamental plants, nutrient-rich soil, and fertiliser are also sold in laikes agores.

A few people's markets, usually in high-population neighbourhoods, also sell refrigerated seafood, cheese, salamis, and other produce which is preserved in refrigerators set up in the streets and supplied with electricity by diesel generators. Some laikes also attract kantines, which also use electricity produced by diesel generators, and prepare and sell souvlakia, sausages-on-a-stick (souvlaki loukaniko), long-burgers-on-a-stick (souvlaki bifteki), bifteki (Greek stuffed hamburgers), soft drinks, et cetera.

Most people's markets also sell traditional home-made/farmer-made olive oil, white wine, red wine, and other products, typically sold in 1.5 litre containers.

In addition to the food market, there is often a market for clothing and kitchenware, with very low prices. In Chania, Crete for instance, this is as large as the agricultural market and as popular. Many of the vendors are Romani. This is an important resource for many Greeks, whose often low salaries make it impossible for them to shop in the stores.

== Prevalence ==
People's markets exist in all regions of Greece, as each settlement with at least 500 people can have their own laiki agora. There are 44 separate markets in downtown Athens alone.

People's markets can be founded in any city neighbourhood, town, suburb, or village with a population of at least 500 people. The markets are popular all over Greece, including the capital city, Athens, where there are 44 laikes agores only in downtown, as well as other major cities such as Chania or Patras. They are organised once a week, the same weekday for each particular neighbourhood.

== Conveniences ==
The sellers in the people's markets spend considerable amounts of time selling their produce to consumers, and as a result, at least in the area of Athens, the organisation responsible for organising the markets sets up mobile toilets (usually chemical toilets) for their convenience whenever a laiki agora is organised in a neighbourhood (typically once a week).

== Marketing aspects ==
Personal marketing is important for the success of a seller in a people's market. Often, consumers buy from the sellers they know best, thus basing their purchase decisions on a trust basis. Chatting and frequent social interaction between sellers and consumers is very common, and is cited as one of the reasons many consumers prefer to buy from people's markets instead of supermarkets where the purchasing experience is often less personal.

Consumers are able to choose each individual fruit, fish, or other product from the seller's pagos (a wooden installation where the products are put), putting their chosen produce in a paper bag or thin bag (plastic) which is then given to the seller for weight measurement. The local social custom is to choose the fruits or other fresh produce quickly without touching too hard, especially for sensitive vegetables such as tomatoes.

Payment is almost universally done with cash in Euro, but a very small number of "professionals", usually those selling household equipment in high-income neighbourhoods of Athens, accept credit card payments (Visa or MasterCard) with terminals communicating with the bank through GPRS.

=== Pricing ===
Pricing is often by the kilogram, but per-item pricing is also common.

Many sellers use the same price by the kilo for all their produce or across many different kinds of products within the same category (e.g. all apples having the same price, no matter whether they are red, green, yellow, or pink apples, although usually these varieties carry different prices in the general market) because in this way the consumer can place various products in the same paper bag and weighting is simplified a lot, thus achieving higher sales. This is common in apples and pears.

Prices are always listed on a paper card displayed along with the produce.

==== Dynamic pricing ====
Sellers change their prices frequently within the same day, especially for sensitive products such as fish.

The price is usually high early in the morning (8-9h00) and is lowered as the time passes, especially if the product does not sell well that particular day. The new price is advertised on paper cards and orally. The lowest possible prices can be found after the midday (particularly by 13-14h00), often less than half the original starting price.

After 13h30 or on 14h00 the sellers can make significant discounts where large quantities of fresh fruit or unsold fish can be sold en-masse for extremely low prices. Sometimes parts of the produce can be given for free if the buyer has cultivated a personal relation with a particular farmer or other seller.

=== Consumer demographics ===
The demographics of the consumers visiting the people's markets are varied. According to the Municipality of Athens people of all ages and incomes visit the laikes agores, at least in the area of the municipality which includes the downtown of Athens (Kentro in Greek).

== Social aspects ==
Laikes agores serve other needs of the lives of the Greeks apart from their consuming needs: they serve the need to communicate with fellow citizens.

People's market are usually organised within a small area, typically a straight street, and the density of people buying foodstuffs can be quite high as the market is organised within a limited and strict timeframe (8h00-14h00). This, together with the varied demographics of the buyers as typically the whole town's or neighbourhood's inhabitants leave their homes concurrently to visit the same market, cause friends and acquaintances to spot each other while they make their purchases.

As friends find their fellow friends on the market they often stop to exchange news, tell jokes, or to participate in general socialisation. This social contact is particularly useful in cities, as it helps urban dwellers to stay in contact and maintain long friendships with their neighbours. In this sense, the laikes agores can be thought as being a modern version of the agora of Ancient Greece.

Buyers also engage in social contact with the sellers, which often results in friendship and stable, loyal, multi-year buyer-seller relationships.

== Organisational and legal aspects ==
Laikes agores are supported by the government's tax income and their management is undertaken by various organisations that have a strict geographical scope.

The Division of people's markets by Attica Region (Diefthinsi laikon agoron, Διεύθυνση λαϊκών αγορών) is responsible for the people's markets in the Region of Attica.

== See also ==
- Dimotiki agora (demotic market), a different style of traditional market, which is enclosed (a covered market), rather than in the street.
- Varvakios Agora, the largest non-covered municipality market in Athens on the Odos Athinas.
