= Flat-fee MLS =

Flat-fee multiple listing service or flat-fee MLS refers to the practice in the real estate industry of a seller entering into an "à la carte service agreement" with a real estate broker who accepts a flat fee rather than a percentage of the sale price for the listing side of the transaction. A flat-fee MLS brokerage typically unbundles the services a traditional real estate brokerage offers and lists the property for sale in the local multiple listing service (MLS) à la carte without requiring the seller to use all services.

The primary objective of a flat-fee listing is to be exposed on the MLS and cut the listing side of the commission completely out by dealing directly with "buyer's agents." In most cases, the seller saves approximately half of the traditional commission and maintains complete freedom to sell on their own. The buyer's broker is still typically offered a percentage though that could be a flat fee as well.

== History ==
A flat-fee listing on the MLS would provide the seller with a listing just like any other listing with the difference being they maintained freedom to sell on their own and had to deal directly with inquiring agents all the way through contract and closing. At first, there was an uprising by full service Real Estate companies because this service would surely cut their ability to monopolize the MLS and the ability to get Exclusive Right of Sale Listings where no matter what they would get a commission. The FTC eventually stepped in and ruled that the Flat-fee model be able to remain in place because it gave the home sellers another option which would save them money and introduce more competition to the marketplace. In addition, the seller benefits from being syndicated to other site feeds like Zillow, Trulia, Realtor.com and around 100 other web sites which is automatic once it is on the MLS.

Traditionally real estate brokerage services in the United States have been delivered as part of a bundled package including such services as (i) assisting the seller in setting a list price for the property; (ii) marketing and advertising a property for sale, including listing the property in the MLS; (iii) handling buyer inquiries and scheduling and arranging showings of the property to prospective home buyers; (iv) holding "Open Houses" to allow the public to preview a property for sale; (v) handling contract preparation and negotiation on behalf of the seller; (vi) management of the real estate transaction to final settlement (or closing escrow). The fee structure for this bundled package of services in the United States and Canada has generally been to pay a commission on the gross sales price of the property of between 5 and 7%.

Stephen J. Dubner and Steven D. Levitt report that this typical large commission does not even benefit the average real estate broker as much as one might expect from the recent run up in housing prices because of the excessively large amount of time that the average real estate broker must spend trolling for new clients, and the relatively small percentage of their time they spend actually performing real estate services for each client.

However, the fixed fee concept existed for many years before the internet became popular. There are also fixed fee broker groups that cooperate with each other across the United States. Many FSBO websites will also locate local flat fee brokers for interested sellers. Those offerings normally include a FSBO webpage to assist in advertising the property.

In recent years, with the unbundling of services accelerated by the advent of the Internet, a number of brokerage models have developed to cater to the FSBO market by providing services on an "a la carte" basis. The widespread availability of information about properties for sale has caused downward pressure on real estate fees in the United States. For changes in the industry also read real estate trends.

A useful overview of real-estate payment practices in the United States is found in an October 2006 report by the AEI-Brookings Joint Center for Regulatory Studies. The study notes that "real estate broker commissions are strangely unrelated to either the quantity or quality of the service rendered or even to the value provided." It further concludes that "consumers would benefit most from a fee-for-service approach – combining flat fees, hourly fees, and bonuses, including percentages of extra value created." It offers a number of examples of such options.

== Overview ==
In a flat fee MLS listing, the listing agreement between the real estate broker and the property owner typically requires the broker to enter the property into the MLS and provide other contracted services, with the broker acting as what the traditional industry has coined a "limited service broker". However, the flat fee industry prefers the term à la carte broker because the services are not limited. Instead freedom of choice is expanded to allow sellers to pick from a menu of services. For example, if a seller opts to purchase marketing in an MLS, and other distribution channels only, that does not imply that the listing broker would not have negotiated or offered more services if the seller wanted to pay for those services. In fact many flat fee brokers offer upgraded packages that sellers often contract for. Consequently, the services is not limited but instead custom crafted to the needs and wants of the seller.

Currently there are numerous descriptions used to describe reduced fee and discounted real estate services, some of which are not based on providing limited services. The Department of Justice uses terms such as "nontraditional", "fee-for-service", and "menu driven", which are in contrast to "traditional" real estate service(s) offered by a licensed real estate broker to a seller of real estate. It is important that the consumer understand there is not currently any standard terminology for nontraditional real estate services though à la carte is probably the best description.

Within the nontraditional real estate services market, there are multiple programs offered to sellers that share the common objective of saving the consumer money by reducing the overall expense of selling real estate. A "nontraditional service" does not automatically entail "limited service". For instance, some full-service brokers list properties under a full-service agreement but charge a "flat rate" that is not a percentage of the sales price. This full-service option usually is a discounted full-service listing, but it is different from the "Flat Fee" MLS service which is the subject of this discussion. Until the industry evolves and adopts a standard practice of terminology, both consumers and real estate brokers will continue to experience some confusion over the terminology describing the services being offered. In all circumstances, the consumer should thoroughly understand the services being provided and the manner of compensation for those services.

The flat fee MLS service is radically different from traditional real estate brokerage services. Because every State requires a listing agreement between a real estate broker and property owner, the rapid explosion of flat fee service providers has created a gap in the States developing laws governing flat fee services provided by real estate broker. In most real estate board / MLS systems, there are generally two types of listing agreements, although some Boards allow others. The first and most common is called an "Exclusive Right to Sell" listing, in which the seller will not only pay a commission if their property is sold through their listing broker or another MLS broker (buyers broker), but also if the seller finds their own buyer. In an "Exclusive Right to Sell" listing, the listing broker gets the commission specified in the listing agreement regardless of who actually finds the buyer. The second type of listing agreement is called an "Exclusive Agency" listing agreement. This "Exclusive Agency" is one form of agreement that can be used to allow the seller to market their property "By Owner" and pay zero commission if they are successful in finding their own buyer. It is this "Exclusive Agency" listing agreement that forms the basis for many flat fee service provider's listing agreements. In essence, Flat Fee MLS listings are a logical progression of reduced-cost selling alternatives to property owners who are comfortable with managing part or all of the selling process, who believe the MLS will effectively "advertise" their property, and who are willing to pay a buyer's broker a commission.

Listing fees for "flat fee MLS" services cover a wide range of options in most cases, but generally include two components: the flat fee paid to the listing broker, and the commission the property owner agrees to pay a Buyer's Broker (if there is one). The commission which is normally paid to the "listing" broker is attempted to be replaced by payment of the flat fee, which is paid in advance by the seller and is non-refundable, regardless of whether or not the property sells. Additionally the brokerage associated with the "flat fee MLS" must also pay for an actual MLS (Multiple Listing Service) themselves, where real estate brokers can list on 100s of real estate listing sites on behalf of the property seller. "Flat fee MLS" services should not be confused with actual local MLS services or Nationwide, digital MLS services, such as MyStateMLS.

== Minimum service laws ==
As of May 2015, 11 states and the District of Columbia have passed some form of "minimum service laws" that require consumers to pay for those services whether they want to or not. An additional eight states have minimum service requirements but allow consumers to waive those extra services, preserving choice.

While the DOJ and FTC monitor and challenge real estate laws or changes to law perceived as anti-competitive in all States, this Press Release from April 2005 is an example of their effort: "The Department of Justice and the Federal Trade Commission (FTC) issued a joint letter urging the state-created Texas Real Estate Commission to reject a proposed regulation that would change current rules by imposing new restrictions on the ability of Texas real estate professionals to offer flexibility in brokerage services. The agencies expressed concern that the proposed regulation would not only cause Texas consumers to pay more for real estate services, but also would reduce consumer choice by restricting the ability of real estate brokers to provide services tailored to customer needs."

The United States Department of Justice Antitrust Division announced the launch of a new web site in October 2007 to "educate consumers and policymakers about the potential benefits that competition can bring to consumers of real estate brokerage services and the barriers that inhibit that competition." Among other findings, they report that new sales models can reduce consumer home sales costs "by thousands of dollars. For example, in states that allow open competition, some buyer's brokers rebate up to two-thirds of their commission to the customer, and some seller's brokers offer limited-service packages that let sellers list their homes on the local multiple listing service (MLS) for as little as a few hundred dollars." "Competition and Real Estate", includes a link to the real estate laws of each U.S. state and how they support or inhibit real estate brokerage competition.

== Need to inform the public via written disclosures ==
An alternative to "minimum service laws" is a written disclosure to home buyers and sellers of exactly which services will be offered and which services will not be offered. Proponents of this method point out that a disclosure-based alternative allows consumers to be fully informed about the services they may not receive using flat fee or limited services while still allowing them a choice in the types of services to be purchased. Ohio and Virginia are states that have recently passed legislation to allow a new form of representation called "limited service representative" which calls for the real estate practitioner to (i) disclose that the licensee is acting as a limited service representative; (ii) provide a list of the specific services that the licensee will provide to the client; and (iii) provides a list of the specific duties of a standard broker set out in subdivision that the limited service representative will not provide to the client.

However, service level disclosures have sometimes been a normal aspect of the contractual terms of all real estate brokers. Practicality dictates the need to outline the scope of services provided in order to create any kind of listing agreement. Therefore, in some jurisdictions, both full-service and limited-service brokers have described the services they are providing. Over the years even full-service brokers have offered various service options such as "agency listings" and, in some states, "open listings".

These alternative service options existed long before flat fee brokers introduced them on the internet. In some cases, such services were offered to friends or relatives of real estate brokers and to institutions such as banks or investors that could find a broker to provide such options. It is the proliferation of these services on the internet that has drawn attention from the real estate industry and legislatures.

== See also ==
- For sale by owner
- Multiple listing service
- Real estate trends
