= Investment club =

Group of people who pool their money to make investments

An investment club is a group of individuals who meet for the purpose of pooling money and investing; members typically meet periodically to make investment decisions as a group through a voting process and recording of minutes, or gather information and perform investment transactions outside the group. In the US the upper limit for the value of an investment club's worth is $25m. There is no lower limit. Investment clubs provide members a means to learn about markets, while meeting and working with people who have similar interests.

== History ==
Although people have been investing in groups for thousands of years, the world's first investment club was allegedly established in Texas in 1898 back in the days of the Wild West when few investments could be considered safe. Investment clubs were seen as an ideal way of spreading the risk – away from just cattle.

While the first investment club on record dates back to the 1800s in Western America, various online communities devoted to this type of investing have recently emerged and have contributed to the personal investing boom in the United States. One of the reasons that people come together in investment clubs is to learn how to invest. In Britain investment clubs took off in the 1950s, but the formation rate fell during the 2008 financial crisis.

== Starting an investment club ==
Industry observers recommend prospective members adhere to these guidelines:

- Consult a tax adviser on the taxation implications of the club's selected legal structure
- Establish an investment mission, policy and goals that allow active participation before investing
- Draw up a written operating or membership agreement covering asset management rules and membership changes
- Evaluate fees for different tools and platforms to maximize returns.
- Focus on learning and making money.

== Club types ==
=== High school extracurricular investment clubs ===
This form of investment club usually meets to develop interest in investing and the intricacies of investing for minors, usually high school students. They typically are led by an adult who has experience in professional investing.

=== Stock, mutual fund or Bond investment clubs ===
These clubs are groups of people that pool their money to purchase stocks, stock options, mutual funds or bonds. Many clubs are educational in nature with objectives in line with learning how to make smart long-term investments. The National Association of Investors Corporation is a non-profit organization of many investment clubs with this purpose. These clubs may decide to buy or sell investments typically based on a majority votes.

Club objectives do vary and in the U.S. the Securities and Exchange Commission may require that a club be registered depending on the intent of investment. The SEC distinguishes between clubs on the basis of several laws including the Securities Act of 1933 and Investment Company Act of 1940, which are concerned with whether the club issues membership interests that are effectively securities.

Club officers and members are not normally required to hold a securities license as long as they refrain from soliciting compensation in exchange for financial advice or soliciting the sale of stock, mutual funds or bonds in third-party companies. One allowed exception is that a CEO / president or CFO of a C corporation is allowed to solicit stock or bonds in their corporation as long as they provide a private placement memorandum that complies with the law to their new shareholders. One additional requirement is that non-accredited investors must be Directors of the C corporation in addition to being shareholders.

=== Real estate investment clubs ===
Clubs of this type are most commonly publicized as a real estate investment group or company, rather than a club. The legal distinction according to the SEC is having 100 members or less. Whereas, a real estate investment group would normally have more than 100 investors. These clubs normally buy real estate or notes (loans originated by a licensed third party) to benefit from: cash flow, appreciation of assets, instant equity, tax benefits from deductions or qualified dividends, group buying power, monthly or daily compounding, higher liquidity and diversification of risk. Real estate transactions are limited to 35 participants to meet the legal requirements of many states for being closely held, and can be legally organized as a sole proprietorship transferring assets to a group living trust, limited liability company, limited liability partnership, general partnership or C corporation.

=== Business investment clubs ===
These clubs are often called incubators and are formed to purchase businesses that generate cash flow and equity. Investment types range from a group of people buying lower risk franchises with at least two years of significant revenues and positive cash flow like major fast food franchises, gas stations and hotels to higher risk businesses without an income history like start-ups, inventions, or product patenting and prototype development.

=== Hybrid investment clubs ===
Hybrid clubs are a combination of two or more of the above types of investment clubs. Typically, real estate investment clubs are lower in risk and provide higher returns of 21% to 70% than stock, mutual fund or bond investment clubs due to the ongoing need for housing and population growth. Business investment clubs have about equal risk when compared to stock, mutual fund or bond investment clubs. However, business investment clubs have several additional benefits which include significantly higher returns and lower operating expenses measured by the net profit per year divided by the amount of cash necessary to purchase the business. Additionally, you can also hire yourself or family members to work in the business as employees.

=== Self-directed investment clubs ===
A self-directed investment club is a type of investment club in which members do not make financial contributions, but rather meet on a regular or informal basis to share stock tips and advice, and then invest in their individual portfolios, not in a common club portfolio (as is more typical of investment clubs). The phrase was coined by financial author and investment club expert Douglas Gerlach in Investment Clubs for Dummies.

== Conduct of business ==
In order to operate an investment club, business must be conducted in a somewhat orderly fashion. The level of formality will vary based on the club type. A typical club will have informal channels of communication via mailing lists, Twitter accounts or message boards. In addition to the informal channels of communication, an investment club must set up formal channels of communication to conduct business. Typically, this is done with monthly meetings. A typical meeting agenda will include all the normal activity you would expect in an organization with elected officials. A typical meeting agenda:

- Roll call
- Old business – list of any unfinished business from the previous meeting.
- Summary of votes – Summary of all voted decisions from the previous meeting
- NAV presentation – the net asset value of the club will indicate what each club member is worth on paper.
- Available funds – a presentation of available funds to invest.
- Presentation of current research – assigned members present research.
- Vote to hold or invest – a vote to hold cash, sell current assets or invest in one of the investment options
- Investment vote – a final vote on an investment strategy specifying an exact amount to invest and strategy to execute that investment.
- Other business – typically, other business will include proxy voting needs or other day-to-day business operational needs. This could also include options to change a brokerage house, or discussions of counter party risk.
- Formal close of meeting

== Legal structure ==
=== United Kingdom ===
Investment clubs are normally unincorporated associations. Members' contributions are converted into 'units' whose value rises and falls in line with the value of the underlying investments. The clubs are not taxed corporately, and members should account individually for their share of profits and capital gains.

=== United States ===
Investment clubs are generally formed as general partnerships, but could also be formed as limited liability companies, limited liability partnerships, corporations, or sole proprietorship that transfer real estate assets to a group living trust (similar to a family trust). While an investment club could incorporate, the double tax treatment on corporate distributions makes the corporate structure less desirable than a partnership except in the case when a C corporation pays out qualified dividends after deducting allowable expenses. Typically, a general partnership does not generate any tax liability on its own; instead, any tax liability is passed through to members each year. However, income taxes are generally much higher than taxes on qualified dividends.

In order to understand the legal structure that an investment club should choose, the club should first understand its club type. Each of the different club types will have different legal requirements as well as different reporting requirements. Typically, the SEC only requires reporting for investment groups with over 100 members, which is reclassified as an investment group, not an investment club. Publicly held offerings like a real estate investment trust also have additional reporting requirements.

== Tax implications ==
Investment club accounting software can facilitate the management of a club's books and the preparation of tax filings.

In the United States, investment club partnerships may have to file form 1065 and schedules K-1 with the IRS each year, and with states that require partnership filings.

In the United Kingdom investment clubs and their members are required to submit form 185 (new) to HMRC each year.

== See also ==
- List of finance topics
