= Closing (sales) =

Process of making a sale

Closing is a sales term which refers to the process of making a sale. The sales sense springs from real estate, where closing is the final step of a transaction. In sales, it is used more generally to mean achievement of the desired outcome, which may be an exchange of money or acquiring a signature. Salespeople are often taught to think of targets not as strangers, but rather as prospective customers who already want or need what is being sold. Such prospects need only be "closed".

== Overview ==
"Closing" is distinguished from ordinary practices such as explaining a product's benefits or justifying an expense. It is reserved for more artful means of persuasion, which some compare with confidence tricks. For example, a salesman might mention that his product is popular with a person's neighbors, knowing that people tend to follow perceived trends. This is known as the Jones theory.

In automobile dealerships, a "closer" is often a senior salesman experienced in closing difficult deals.

Closing techniques include major and minor closing questions, for example:

- Minor close: "Mr. Customer, would you prefer lighter or darker flooring in your new home?"
- Minor close: "Mr. Customer, would you like go with standard kitchen countertops or do you prefer to go with the granite upgrade?"
- Major close: "Mr. Customer, now that we've taken care of your flooring and countertop preferences let's step in to my office so that we can wrap up the paperwork on your new home."

Since fear of rejection is one of the biggest impediments to sales success for many people in sales functions, they do not actually ask for the business. Hence the constant search for "closers" in sales recruitment.

All of the "closing" techniques below are different ways to ask for the business. No matter how skillfully applied the customer has the option to answer "No."

== Most common techniques ==
- Alternative choice close: also called the positive choice close, in which the salesperson presents the prospect with two options, either of which ends in a sale. "Would you prefer that in red or blue?"
- Apology close: in which the salesperson apologizes for not yet closing the sale. "I owe you an apology. Somewhere along the line, I must have left out important information, or in some way left you room for doubt. We both know this product suits your needs perfectly, and so the fault here must be with me."
- Assumptive close: also known as the presumptive close, in which the salesperson intentionally assumes that the prospect has already agreed to buy, and wraps up the sale. "Just pass me your credit card and I'll get the paperwork ready."
- Balance sheet close: also called the Ben Franklin close, in which the salesperson and the prospect build together a pros-and-cons list of whether to buy the product, with the salesperson trying to ensure the pros list is longer than the cons.
- Cradle to grave close: in which the salesperson undercuts prospect objections that it is too soon to buy by telling them there is never a convenient time in life to make a major purchase, and they must therefore do it anyway.
- Direct close: in which the salesperson simply directly asks the prospect to buy. Salespeople are discouraged from using this technique unless they are very sure the prospect is ready to commit.
- Indirect close: also known as the question close, in which the salesperson moves to the close with an indirect or soft question. "How do you feel about these terms" or "how does this agreement look to you?"
- Minor point close: in which the salesperson deliberately gains agreement with the prospect on a minor point, and uses it to assume that the sale is closed. "Would the front door look better painted red? No? Okay, then we'll leave it the colour it is."
- Negative assumption close: in which the salesperson asks two final questions, repeating them until he or she achieves the sale. "Do you have any more questions for me?" and "do you see any reason why you wouldn't buy this product?" This tactic is often used in job interviews.
- Possibility of loss close: also known as the pressure close, in which the salesperson points out that failing to close could result in missed opportunity, for example because a product may sell out or its price rise.
- Puppy dog close: in which the salesperson gives the product to the prospect on a trial basis, to test before a sale is agreed upon.
- Sales contest close: in which the salesperson offers the prospect a special incentive to close, disarming suspicion with a credible "selfish" justification. "How about if I throw in free shipping? If I make this sale, I'll win a trip to Spain."
- Sharp angle close: in which the salesperson responds to a prospect question with a request to close. "Can you get the system up and running within two weeks?" "If I guarantee it, do we have a deal?"
- 70/30 rule close: The 70/30 rule explains exactly how you should talk to a client. The salesperson speaks for the remaining 30% of the time, while the consumer does 70% of the talking. Listening to and understanding the customer's pain areas is essential while selling things.
- Need close: When a salesperson discovers that their product or service immediately addresses all of the client's pain concerns, he or she can use the necessary sales closing strategy. A close is almost certain in this circumstance, but he or she must maintain their composure and consider the client's requirements.
- Urgency close: create a sense that an urgent decision needs to be made: "now or never"; "we can't hold this price beyond today".
