= Disintermediation =

Eliminating middlemen from supply chain

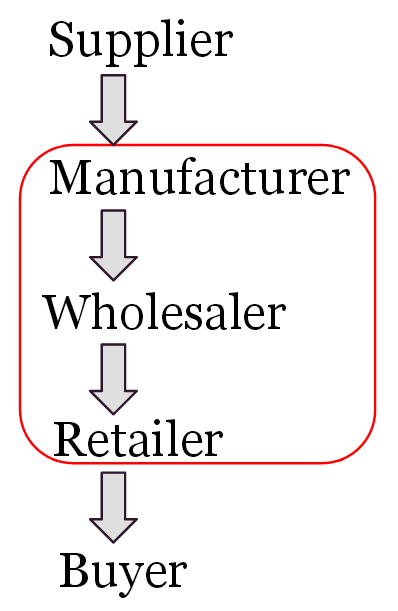
The disintermediation process

Intermediary B may be bypassed by A to connect with C directly.

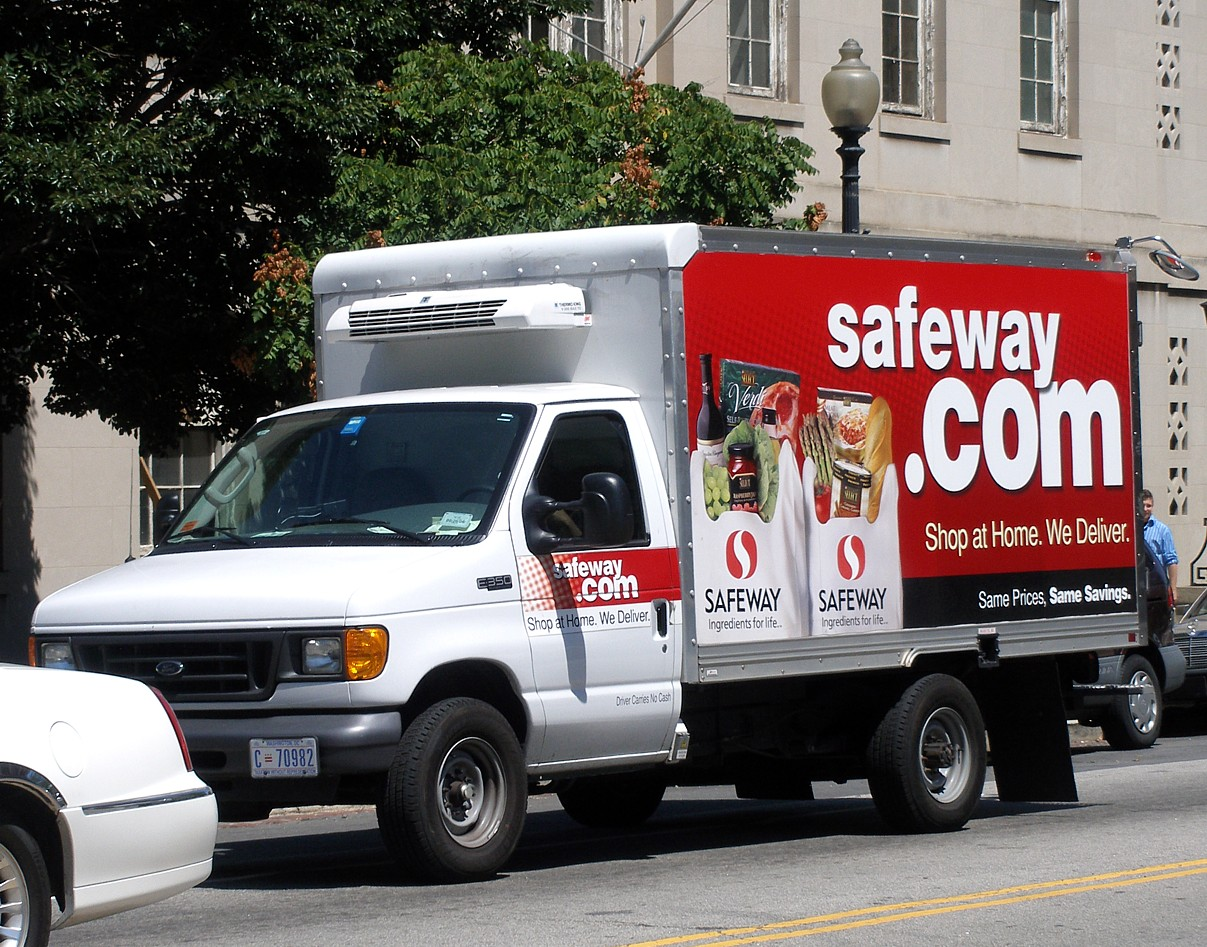
Although Webvan failed in its goal of disintermediating the North American supermarket industry, several supermarket chains (like Safeway Inc.) have launched their own delivery services to target the niche market to which Webvan catered.

Disintermediation is the removal of intermediaries in economics from a supply chain, or "cutting out the middlemen" in connection with a transaction or a series of transactions. Instead of going through traditional distribution channels, which had some type of intermediary (such as a distributor, wholesaler, broker, or agent), companies deal with customers directly and vice versa, for example via the Internet.

== History ==
In 1967, the term was originally applied to the banking industry; disintermediation occurred when consumers avoided the intermediation of banks by investing directly in securities (government and private bonds, insurance companies, hedge funds, mutual funds and stocks) rather than leaving their money in savings accounts. The original cause was a U.S. government regulation (Regulation Q) which limited the interest rate paid on interest bearing accounts which were insured by the Federal Deposit Insurance Corporation.

It was later applied more generally to "cutting out the middleman" in commerce, though the financial meaning remained predominant. Only in the late 1990s did it become widely popularized.

Since the introduction of ChatGPT, researchers have posited in 2025, that disintermediation of Wikipedia is already happening and predicted only to increase over time.

== Reintermediation ==
Reintermediation can be defined as the reintroduction of an intermediary between end users (consumers) and a producer. This term applies especially to instances in which disintermediation has occurred first.

At the start of the Internet revolution, electronic commerce was seen as a tool of disintermediation for cutting operating costs. The concept was that by allowing consumers to purchase products directly from producers via the Internet, the product delivery chain would be drastically shortened, thereby "disintermediating" the standard supply model middlemen. However, what largely happened was that new intermediaries appeared in the digital landscape (e.g., Amazon.com and eBay).

Reintermediation occurred due to many new problems associated with the e-commerce disintermediation concept, largely centered on the issues associated with the direct-to-consumers model. The high cost of shipping many small orders, customer service issues, and confronting the wrath of disintermediated retailers and supply channel partners all presented real obstacles. Huge resources are required to accommodate presales and postsales issues of individual consumers. Before disintermediation, supply chain middlemen acted as salespeople for the producers. Without them, the producer itself would have to handle procuring those customers. Selling online has its own associated costs: developing quality websites, maintaining product information, and marketing expenses all add up. Finally, limiting a product's availability to Internet channels forces the producer to compete with the rest of the Internet for customers' attention, a space that is becoming increasingly crowded.

== Examples ==
Notable examples of disintermediation include Dell and Apple, which sell many of their systems direct-to-consumer—thus bypassing traditional retail chains, having succeeded in creating brands well recognized by customers, profitable and with continuous growth.

=== In the automotive industry ===
As of 2013, Tesla avoided using dealers as middlemen by offering their own outlets, which have only a few vehicles for display and test driving; customers complete their full purchase online. This approach allowed Tesla to raise auto gross profit by about 34%. This strategy also allows Tesla to control more of its customers' experience and build online community. Following Tesla's success, two other automotive brands, Audi and General Motors decided to start trials of direct sales in 2012 and 2013 respectively.

== Costs ==
Disintermediation may decrease the total cost of servicing customers and may allow the manufacturer to increase profit margins and/or reduce prices. Disintermediation initiated by consumers is often the result of high market transparency, in that buyers are aware of supply prices direct from the manufacturer. Buyers may choose to bypass the middlemen (wholesalers and retailers) to buy directly from the manufacturer, and pay less. Buyers can alternatively elect to purchase from wholesalers. Often, a business-to-consumer electronic commerce (B2C) company functions as the bridge between buyer and manufacturer.

However manufacturers will still incur distribution costs, such as the physical transport of goods, packaging in small units, advertising, and customer helplines, some or all of which would previously have been borne by the intermediary. To illustrate, a typical B2C supply chain is composed of four or five entities. These are the supplier, manufacturer, wholesaler, retailer and buyer.

== See also ==
- Flat fee MLS — An example of disintermediation in the Real Estate industry.
- Laiki agora - an example of disintermediation of agricultural foodstuffs in Greece
- Outlet store
- Social peer-to-peer processes
- Direct-to-consumer
- Global Distribution Systems (Travel industry)
