= Buying agent =

Offer to buy things on behalf of another

Buying agents or purchasing agents are people or companies that offer to buy goods or property on behalf of another party. Indent agents or indenting agents (or firms) are alternative terms for buying agents. An indent is an order for goods under specified conditions of sale.

There are agents for all kinds of products, from raw material commodities through to specialized custom equipment.

== Real estate ==
In the United States, agents who buy real estate in this way are also known as property search agents or buyers’ agents and are professionals exclusively acting on behalf of a property buyer who assists the client during the entire purchasing process from sourcing the properties that correspond to the clients' requirements to negotiating the best possible price and terms with the seller and helping the client during the legal process to complete the acquisition.

Buying agents often preview properties on behalf of their clients, shortlist the most suitable, and usually accompany clients to all viewings. In order to ensure the most efficient property viewing experience, most agents offer a chauffeur and sometimes even helicopter viewings to their high-end clients. Often they will also offer personal concierge services which can schedule all viewings, book hotels, transfers and other amenities for the client. These services can be particularly useful to international clients who tend to fly in to view properties. In addition agents are typically able to connect the client with all necessary technical trades people who are required at different stages of the buying process such as lawyers, surveyors and other professionals.

Buying agents might have access to off-market properties through their network of contacts, although this depends on the market conditions and on how well connected the agent is locally.

The ethical behavior is a very important aspect to measure the professionalism of a buying agent: at any time they must advise their clients with no self-interest for their own success fee.

While initially buying agents catered exclusively to wealthier demographics, lately, especially in more competitive markets like London or Paris, the entry-level has significantly dropped to properties valued at around £500,000 or €500,000 (see The Daily Telegraph,)

At one end of the spectrum lie the super introduced local property experts who can be an invaluable resource for a buyer who is set on off-market or pre-market properties as well as private deals. These professionals are often able to source off-market because they have close ties with estate agents (or, in the United States, real estate brokers), they know other local intermediaries who may flag exclusive confidential deals, such as lawyers, private bankers, investment managers or other professionals and they sometimes know personally the owners of the best luxury properties for sale in the area they cover. If this is what the buyer is looking for then the size of the company is less relevant as contacts are made over time and lie in the hands of a few experienced professionals who may operate within larger organizations as well as on their own. Buying agents also often have close ties with property developers where the agent can get access to new properties before they come onto the open market.

Experienced buying agents often possess comprehensive knowledge of properties within a target market, enabling them to contact owners directly regarding potential off-market sales. While this proactive approach can sometimes reduce a buyer's negotiating leverage, it grants exclusive access to unlisted properties. Proficient negotiation by the agent can mitigate the risk of paying a premium price.

Additionally, there are agencies relocation companies which offer paperwork services to clients; they are connected to various professionals and other firms and provide end-to-end services. These may be less capable of scouting off-market transactions, or deal directly with private property owners.

Independent buying agents like to stress their autonomy from selling agencies who, depending on the country, either act on behalf of sellers or as mediators between the two parties (See The Independent,). On the other side some well known estate agencies also offer buying services despite reservations over conflict of interest.

Because of the different nature of buying agencies, prospect buyers are often advised to contact more than one company to compare and contrast their benefits. As is often the case, it can be better to hire a professional who is more capable to listen and understand our needs even though his or her company does not entirely tick all the other boxes.

Most buying agents have significant transactional experience; however, like estate agents, only few of these professionals have a surveying qualification so they may not be the best advisors when it comes to valuing the property and predicting future market trends. For this reason the buyer may rely on other advisors or their own judgment before taking an investment decision.

From a geographical standpoint buying agents’ coverage ranges from a rather limited focus on few specific city districts or sub regional areas (a few towns and their surroundings) to nationwide 'chain' services. However each company has a few areas where it is stronger and only in those locations may it be able to deliver a superior value, especially when it comes to sourcing special opportunities. Only few companies in Europe have expanded to cover more than one country by employing different professionals.

There are varying terms for a buying agent which include: property consultant, property acquisition consultant, relocation agent and property finder. As per the above paragraph their skill sets vary slightly but the business is very similar. As this specific section within the property industry is still relatively new, in comparison to estate agents for example, the specific terms used are still debated in each country.

=== Legal requirements ===
In some European countries, like the UK, buying agents do not need to pass any specific exam or get any certification to start practicing their profession while in other countries, like Italy, France or Spain they have to conform to the same qualification and legal requirements as selling agents do, even though the two roles differ substantially. This seeming gap in the regulation may be filled if and when the industry is going to mature.

=== Fees ===
Buying agents fees depend on the specific property market and often vary within a certain country. The overall fee structure is made of a small registration fee which is refundable (provided that the buyer completes the purchase within a certain time defined in the contract) and is charged upfront, and a success fee which is a percentage of the purchase price of the property and is paid at the exchange of contracts or when a preliminary contract is signed.

Buying agents generally require exclusivity meaning that the client cannot continue to search on its own or via estate agents for the duration of the contract, which generally lasts from 3 to 6 months.

French companies are forbidden from charging any registration fees and are required by law to tie all their compensation to the successful completion of the transaction. However good buying agents do not make any profit from the registration fee; the main purpose of the fee is to increase the likelihood that the client is sincerely committed to the purchase; in case they were not they would lose the registration fee after a certain length of time.

The success fee is a percentage of the sale price. Prospect property buyers should know that there are two different arrangements mainly depending on market conditions:

- In markets where the average selling time of a luxury property is high, buying agents tend to split the fee with the selling agent and therefore the service has no additional cost to the buyer. This happens because the selling agent typically prefers splitting his commission with the buying agent rather than waiting longer to find another buyer and sell the same property. In case the buying agent sources a private deal then they charge up to the selling agent commission (for instance the full 5% in the French Riviera up to 2% in Spain.
- In very liquid markets (like London or Paris) the buying agent fee is charged on top of the selling agent fee, so the buying agent service comes at an additional cost to the property buyer unless the buying agent is able to find a property that is not sold by an agent. In that case depending on the market buying agents charge an amount up to the selling agent commission (which is generally higher than the buying agent’s fee).
- Some agents charge a success fee based on the purchase price - this is a fixed percentage. Alternatively other agents charge a fixed amount of money plus a percentage of the saving of the discount to the original asking price.

All these conditions are well specified in the contract agreement that the client signs upfront. Buying agents often claim that they can get a higher discount on the sales price than a private buyer could manage because they better know the prices at which similar properties have been recently exchanged in the market and they make use of good negotiating skills.

A full set of code of ethics is set out by The Property Ombudsman, which any respected buying agent would be a member of.

== See also ==
- International trade
- Personal shopper
- Selling agent
- Property finder
- Buyer brokerage
