= Real estate trends =

Pattern in real estate

A real estate trend is any consistent pattern or change in the general direction of the real estate industry which, over the course of time, causes a statistically noticeable change. This phenomenon can be a result of the economy, a change in mortgage rates, consumer speculations, or other fundamental and non-fundamental reasons.

Because real estate markets vary by country and region, international comparisons often use measures such as house price indexes, rent indexes, price-to-income ratios, and price-to-rent ratios. The Bank for International Settlements publishes residential property price data for around 60 economies, including a selected series intended to improve cross-country comparability.

== Buyer agency growth ==
At one time, all real estate brokers and agents, or Realtors, practiced "single agency", meaning they represented only the seller. In the 1990s, the concept of buyer agency became popular, allowing a buyer to retain an agent who would represent the best interests of the buyer alone. The first national company to provide this service was The Buyer's Agent, Inc. A 2008 study by Consumer Reports indicates that prior to this development, state law presumed that a Realtor represented the seller by default. The same study shows that buyers using buyer agents obtained a savings of $5000 in the price of the home as compared to prices paid by unrepresented buyers. Unrepresented real estate buyers may still contact the seller’s agent directly to schedule property showings; this interaction does not establish agency representation unless disclosed and agreed upon in writing. In such cases, the buyer should be advised by agency disclosure laws (a state law in every state in the U.S.) that any information obtained, as well as all conversations and negotiations undertaken, will be for the benefit of the seller.

== Lower commission rates ==
Historical rates are presented in a report by the Government Accountability Office, Congress's investigative arm. A 2005 study of real estate commission rates, reported that realtors tended to charge, "about 5 percent to 7 percent of a property's selling price...". A 2007 CBS News report suggested that an increase in the number of licensed real estate agents was placing downward pressure on commission rates. Online marketplaces that allow agents to compete for listings have further pressured traditional commission structures.

Another trend is the emergence of alternatives to the commission model, including flat-fee, hourly home selling, and FSBO tools. Some brokerages also offer hybrid models, combining limited flat-fee services with traditional representation.

== Marketing trends ==
The Internet has become a major source of real estate information and marketing in many countries, although the role of online listings, agents, newspapers, and property portals varies by market. When the National Homebuying Survey was conducted in 1981, the most important rated information source in the home search, after agents, was newspaper ads. In 2020, 97% of homebuyers used the internet in their home search. With social distancing and health guidelines coming from the COVID-19 pandemic, technology has played an even larger role in the buying and selling of homes according to a study by the National Association of Realtors (NAR). The majority of real estate companies use popular internet marketing methods like SEO, advertising, and social media.

Online property platforms and classified-ad websites, such as Craigslist in the United States, Daft.ie in the Republic of Ireland and Gumtree in the United Kingdom, became important sources for buyers and sellers in the 21st century. Rapid changes in the market environment forced some countries to introduce new laws regulating real property market on the web.

Even with the introduction of the internet, traditional media and methods of generating leads were still an important part of Real Estate trend:

Though the internet was the most popular source, buyers also cited information from real-estate agents (85%), yard signs (62%), open houses (48%), and print or newspaper ads (47%). Fewer buyers relied on home books or magazines, home builders, television, billboards, and relocation companies.

Mobile applications are also changing the way real estate agents conduct business. Apps like Zillow, Trulia, Zumper, and Rentberry are primarily accessed via mobile devices and have become very popular sources for listing properties for sale or rent. These applications function similarly to websites like Craigslist in that they allow agents or private sellers to list a property like they would in a classified ad albeit with a more dynamic display as well as mechanisms for users browsing a listing to contact the seller directly from the app. These platforms allow buyers to view homes in their desired area from anywhere. Mobile applications are particularly prominent with millennial real estate customers.

== US government involvement ==
The United States Department of Justice Antitrust Division announced the launch of a new website in October 2007 to "educate consumers and policymakers about the potential benefits that competition can bring to consumers of real estate brokerage services and the barriers that inhibit that competition." Among other findings, they report that certain new sales models can reduce consumer home sales costs "by thousands of dollars. For example, in states that allow open competition, some buyer's brokers rebate up to two-thirds of their commission to the customer, and some seller's brokers offer limited-service packages that let sellers list their homes on the local Multiple Listing Service (MLS) for as little as a few hundred dollars." The Justice Department updated their information in a new website in 2016.

== Renting ==
Renting has become a more prominent housing option in some markets, particularly where home ownership has become less affordable. Factors that can affect demand for rental housing include borrowing costs, house prices, rents, income growth, location, household formation, and access to credit. Across the OECD, housing costs have created affordability pressures for both prospective homebuyers and renters.

== See also ==
- Real estate
- United States housing bubble
- Real Estate Transaction Specification (RETS)
- Reduced-commission MLS Listings
- Pocket listing (or exclusive listing)
- List of real estate topics
- Market trend
- Category:Real estate bubbles
- Case–Shiller index
