= Double closing =

A double closing is the simultaneous purchase and sale of a real estate property involving three parties: the original seller, an investor (middleman), and the final buyer.

The underlying reasons for having a double closing vary. The most pressing and usual reason is to allow the middleman to use the purchasers funds to acquire the property from the original seller. Another common reason for a double closing is to conceal the identity of the purchaser or seller.

Typically, a real estate investor first enters into a contract to purchase a property and then subsequently (before closing the purchase) enters into a contract to sell the property (hopefully for a higher price). The investor then utilizes a double closing to close both transactions at approximately the same time.

== The mechanics ==
The mechanics of a double closing vary, depending on who the buyer and seller are, who is providing the financing, and who is conducting the closing. In the simplest form of double closing, the purchaser would pay the purchase monies to the middleman and they would complete a settlement statement (HUD-1) for their transaction. The purchaser would have to wait while the middleman uses most of the purchase monies to purchase the property from the seller. The seller and middleman would also complete a separate settlement statement for their transaction. The middleman would then instruct the seller to deed the property directly to the purchaser.

To keep the purchaser and seller separate, the closing may be conducted in two different rooms or at two different times or locations. Success is more likely if the closing agent is friendly and accommodating.

To simplify the transaction, the middleman may make one settlement statement directly between the purchaser and seller and take his profit as a line item on the settlement statement. This line item is usually on the purchaser's side of the statement as an assignment fee. This may create a problem for the middleman, as assignment fees may be taxed at a different rate than short-term capital gains.

== Legal standpoint ==
From a legal standpoint, most sale contracts stipulate that the seller may pay encumbrances out of the proceeds of the sale. The fact that the original seller still owns the property is definitely an encumbrance. Also, contracts may be assignable, thus allowing the middleman to have the right to assign his purchase contract to the purchaser for a fee.

== See also ==
- Double escrow
