= Equilibrium model of group development =

Sociological theory

The equilibrium model of group development (equilibrium model) is a sociological theory on how people behave in groups.

The model theorizes that group members will work to maintain a balance, or equilibrium, between task-oriented (instrumental) and socio-emotional (expressive) needs. A group can be successful if it maintains this equilibrium.

== Description ==
The equilibrium model was created by Robert Bales, who conducted early empirical studies on group development. His model was the first extensive and systematic description of group development borne out of group observation.

The equilibrium model is a progressive model as it explains group maturity and performance over a given period of time. Bales proposed the model as a means to study the manifestation and incidence of task-oriented and socio-emotional behaviours.

There are three main stages of group development within the equilibrium model.

== Stages ==
- The first stage is orientation. Group members meet, ask questions and exchange information. Task-oriented behaviours are prevalent.
- The second stage is evaluation. Group members express their opinions and attitudes. Socio-emotional behaviours increase.
- The third stage is control. Group members exert pressure to influence group actions and activities.

Overall, as a group moves throughout the three stages, task-oriented behaviours decline while socio-emotional behaviours increase

== Equilibrium ==
Successful group performance and cohesiveness is achieved once a group has matured and the members are able to maintain equilibrium between how well they can solve the task or problem facing the group (task-oriented behaviours) with how well they deal with interpersonal relationships and member satisfaction (socio-emotional behaviours).

Equilibrium may be temporary. For example, as the group encounters a new situation or takes on new members, the group may need to move through the three main stages again.

== Application ==
The equilibrium model has been applied to research in a number of areas including computer-mediated communication (CMC) and educational psychology.
