= Internet Data Exchange =

Business agreement

An Internet Data Exchange (IDX, also known as Information Data Exchange) refers to the agreement between listing (selling) agents or brokers and buyers' agents to display Multiple Listing Service properties online, across multiple websites (via real estate syndication where the listing sgent/broker allows a listing to be syndicated).

IDX search users are home buyers or sellers. Their interests may focus on new development, land, condos, rentals, and any other property a particular MLS lists.

Real estate agents use IDX to market homes, attract leads, and close sales. Online listings can reach a larger audience and better match available homes to prospective buyers.

Rules apply to real estate companies' ability to display property detail. These display rules are set by the Multiple Listing Service organization, which generally forms its policy around the recommendations of the National Association of Realtors. Pricing for IDX services is set by MLS boards and third-party vendors. In some cases, basic IDX services are free, and premium features are available for a fee.

IDX implementations and standards have evolved, as brokers and agents using IDX services, along with companies providing IDX services, have focused on the inherent ability to optimize websites with IDX-driven content.

Options for displaying IDX content exist, including the practice of embedding IDX content into pages and iframe-driven implementation.

== Alternative ==
An alternative policy called Internet Listing Display was considered in 2005 but abandoned as a result of an investigation from the U.S. Department of Justice into anti-competitive practices by traditional real estate brokers.

A common and standard data exchange protocol for IDX information is the Real Estate Transaction Standard (RETS).

== See also ==
- Internet Listing Display (ILD)
- Multiple listing service (MLS)
- Real Estate Transaction Standard
- Virtual Office Website (VOW)
