= Rentberry Inc. =

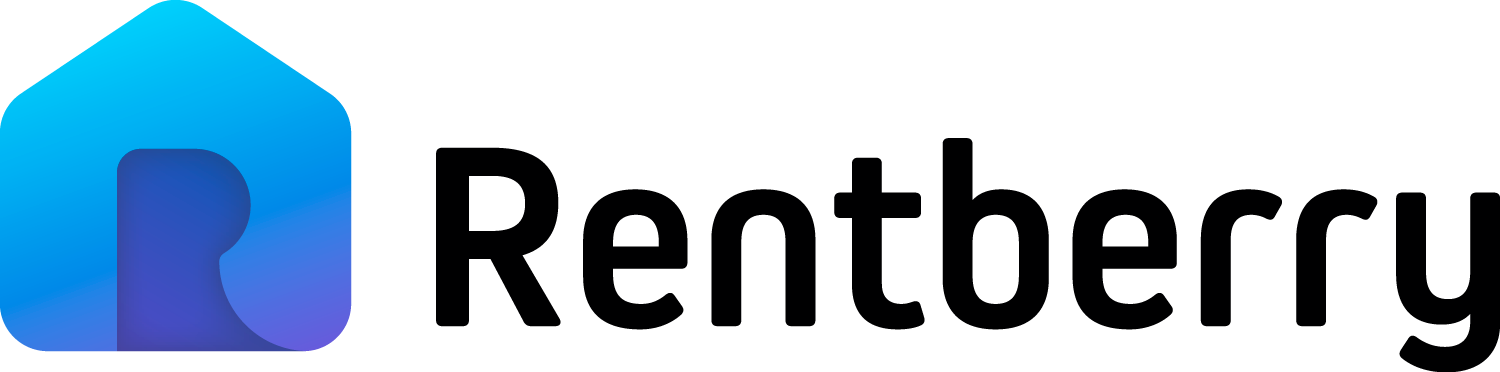
- Industry: Apartment search engine
- Founded: 2015
- Headquarters: San Francisco, USA
- Website: https://rentberry.com/

Rentberry, Inc. is a global home rental platform based in San Francisco, USA, and founded in 2015. It was highly criticized and got controversial reviews from the US press such as Vanity Fair, The Wall Street Journal, The Independent, HuffingtonPost, etc.

== Overview ==
Rentberry is a worldwide rental platform The users (tenants) can bid on their rent with the help of the platform. In 2015, Rentberry product prototype raised first investments from 12 international investors. The platform covered only Los Angeles and New York at that time. In 2017, the company announced partnership with ListHub, Realtor.com and Walk Score to bring together rental billboards and later raised $4.5 million.

In 2020, Rentberry had 4 million users and over 11 million processed properties.

In 2021, Rentberry started offering a Flexible Living concept that allows people to rent a fully furnished apartment or other real estates in a city of their choice for a short term, from 3 months to a year.

In 2022 Rentberry raised capital through a Regulation A offering on the equity crowdfunding platform StartEngine. The campaign has raised over $11.3 million from about 7,000 retail investors.

On April 4, 2022, Rentberry released a new feature dedicated to helping connect displaced Ukrainians searching for temporary rentals with landlords willing to provide their properties to refugees and others in need.

== See also ==
- GuestReady
- Booking.com
