= Double escrow =

Double escrow is a set of real estate transactions involving two contracts of sale for the same property, to two different back-to-back buyers, at the same or two different prices, arranged to close on the same day. At close of escrow, all participants, lenders, sellers, buyers and brokers are informed of all parties involved and all monies that change hands.

For example, a double escrow might be arranged in which Alpha sells Greenacre to Beta, the sale to close at 10:00 am this morning; and Beta then immediately sells Greenacre to Gamma at 2:00 pm this afternoon. Because the two escrows are arranged to close back-to-back on the same day, they are regarded as one "double escrow."

If the underlying purpose of the double escrow is legal, the double escrow will be legal. If the double escrow is undertaken for a criminal purpose, it will not be legal. Otherwise, whether legal or not, a double escrow may not be physically possible.

By definition, both escrows must close on the same day, or it is not "double" escrow but two single escrows. The second sale cannot close until the deed from the first sale is recorded, which means the deed must be recorded on the same day that both closings happen. If a county clerk or recorder's office has a 10:00 am deadline for same-day recording, and if the first sale does not close until after that deadline; then the deed will not be recorded until the next day, and the second escrow cannot close on the same day as the first. This is one situation in which double escrow is impossible.

Another, possible more common reason for double escrow to be impossible is that the county clerk's office might not do same-day recording of deeds, especially if the county is understaffed. Many counties have a time lag of several days to several weeks (even a month or more) between accepting a deed for recording and actual recording (as of the date it was received). In these jurisdictions, double escrow will be completely impossible because the back-to-back sales may not even close during the same week or month, let alone on the same day.
