= Real Estate Transaction Standard =

Data exchange standard

Real Estate Transaction Standard (RETS) is a deprecated data standard that was used by the real estate industry in Canada and the United States to facilitate the exchange of data. RETS was launched in 1999 by the National Association of Realtors and related groups.

RETS was originally created to overcome the difficulties presented by the existence of a large number of organizations desiring to share and distribute real estate information with others. Prior to RETS, much of the data exchange was done using the FTP protocol, which did not allow for queries, and required transfer of complete datasets. The inefficiencies of this approach meant that to generate a query such as "new listings since yesterday", the entire dataset had to be downloaded again and compared with a local copy. Rather than basing a solution on alternatives used by other industries to allow for such queries, RETS was created from the ground up as a new framework to attempt to address the need for a common and efficient standard for the exchange of real estate data. Most North American multiple listing service (MLS) data exchange service providers use the RETS protocol. Although the implementation of the protocol has offered some standardization, the field names of the underlying datasets still vary widely between markets.

RETS is a framework that can be adopted by computer systems to receive data from the multiple listing service (MLS) servers, as well as those of other real estate systems, provided they also have software installed designed to communicate using the RETS framework. The National Association of Realtors refers to RETS as a "common language".

Multiple other systems exist which support the secure and standardized transfer of datasets and associated access control requirements in a secure and efficient manner, such as MySQL. These other systems enjoy widespread adoption across most industries, whereas RETS is for one specific industry. RETS is generally not used outside North America.

In 2018, the Real Estate Standards Organization announced that it planned to retire RETS and replace it with the RESO Web API, a RESTful API.

== See also ==
- Internet Data Exchange
