= Closing (real estate) =

Final transaction when purchasing a home

The closing (also called the completion or settlement) is the final step in executing a real estate transaction. It is the last step in purchasing and financing a property. On the closing day, ownership of the property is transferred from the seller to the buyer. In most jurisdictions, ownership is officially transferred when a deed from the seller is delivered to the buyer.

== The closing process ==
The closing process officially begins once the seller accepts, signs, and returns a purchase offer (also known as a purchase agreement). The closing date is set during the property negotiation phase and is usually several weeks after an offer is formally accepted. At a high level, the closing typically involves the following parties: the seller, the buyer, real estate agents, attorneys (depending on the state), the mortgage lender, and the settlement agency (also known as a title company).

State and regional legislation can greatly impact the closing process, thus it can vary depending on where the property is located. In general, a typical closing process consists of four major steps:

1. Order opening: The closing is ordered by the lender or real estate agent, and the settlement agency contacts all transaction parties to let them know they are handling the closing. A title search is ordered, and a title commitment and closing protection letter (CPL) are issued and sent to the lender. In some cases, closing in escrow may occur. If so, the opening of escrow occurs during this time.
2. Closing preparation: During closing prep, any title issues discovered during the title search are cleared up. A day or two before the closing, the settlement agency will produce a series of documents called closing documents or a closing package that the buyer and seller will sign at the closing. Before the closing happens, the settlement agency must ensure that all the money that the lender and buyer expect to send into escrow matches the total amount expected by parties that need to be paid, such as the seller and real estate agents. This matching process means that accounting information is gathered and the order is “balanced.”
3. The closing: On the closing date, the closing documents are signed by the buyer and seller. On this day, the seller may also deliver possession to the buyer, typically by giving the buyer keys to the property.
4. Post closing: The signed documents are recorded at the recording office. Title insurance is issued during this time. The loan is funded on the funding date and the money is disbursed from escrow on the disbursement date.

== See also ==
- Another Sale Contingency, fulfilled by a "concurrent closing", sometimes called "simultaneous closing"
- Double closing
- Simultaneous closing
- Closing (sales)
- Title insurance
- Mortgage loan
- List of real estate topics
