= Buyer brokerage =

Real estate transaction practice

A buyer brokerage or buyer agency is the practice of real estate brokers and their agents representing a buyer in a real estate transaction rather than, by default, representing the seller either directly or as a sub-agent. In the United Kingdom and Australia, the most common term is buyers agent or buying agent.

In most U.S. states and Canadian provinces, until the 1990s, buyers who worked with an agent of a real estate broker in finding a house were customers of the brokerage, since, by most common law of most states at the time, the broker represented only sellers. It is only since the early 1990s that states passed statute law to create buyers' agency.

Buyer agency can exist exclusively (where a brokerage firm chooses to only represent buyers and never sellers, as an exclusive buyer agent) or, in a full-service company, by offering buyer agency to buyers who become clients. Buyers would have to agree to some form of dual agency in the event that they wished to buy a home which that company has listed for sale and for which it represents the seller.

Brokers may choose to enter into a buyer-brokerage agreement to be represented if the buyer is working with a broker other than the brokerage listing the property. In some cases where dual agency is permitted by law, even the listing broker may represent the buyer. If the buyer does not enter into this agreement, they remain a customer of the broker who is then the sub-agent of seller's broker.

== Buyers as clients ==
With the increase in the practice of buyer agency in North America, especially since the late 1990s in most areas, agents (acting under their brokers) have been able to represent buyers in the transaction with a written "buyer agency agreement" not unlike the "listing agreement" between brokers and sellers (often referred to as a sellers agency). The real estate licensee, upon entering into a written agreement with a buyer, agrees to work for the buyer and in return, the buyer agrees to representation.

At this point, a real estate brokerage owes the buyer the duties on

- Loyalty to the buyer by acting in the buyer's best interest.
- Confidentiality by not disclosing facts that could influence the buyers ability to negotiate the best terms.
- Disclosure to other parties in the transaction that the licensee has been engaged as a buyer's agent.

The agent who represents a buyer will assist in locating a property, evaluate values, negotiate the price and terms on behalf of the buyers, prepares the standard real estate purchase contract and necessary addenda, and coordinate the closing. Agents may also assist the buyer in coordinating necessary inspections, negotiating any needed repairs, and facilitating the transaction by working with the lender, listing agent, title company, and in some areas a real estate attorney. The buyer's agent acts as a fiduciary for the buyer.

== Buyer agency agreements ==
Like the listing agreement with sellers, the agreements with buyers must have a starting and ending date, and they must specify how the buyer's broker is to be paid (by the seller or by the buyer). In addition, it should spell out the duties and obligations of all parties.

The agreement should also specify how a conflict of interest will be handled. A conflict of interest can occur when a buyer represented by a real estate brokerage becomes interested by a seller who that firm also represents.

Another potential conflict of interest can occur when the same firm finds itself representing two buyers who are competing for the same property.

A real estate agency should have a written, objective policy for handling conflicts of interest, which should be disclosed to any potential client in advance.

Buyer Agency Agreements are where a real estate agent represents the buyer of real estate.

With the advent of "Buyer Agency" (Buyer Brokerage) in the early 1990s as opposed to seller agency, a real estate Agent/Broker agrees and contracts to represent the Buyer in their purchase of a home/property. Buyer Agency Agreements were developed to set out the terms and conditions of this representation. They are similar to the written "Listing Agreements", required between Listing Agents and Sellers (property owners). Buyer Agency Agreements set out the main conditions of the relationship between the Buyer Agent and his Buyer Client including such things as the duration of the agreement, the commission to be earned/paid, and the various rights, duties and obligations of the parties.

The Buyer Agent owes fiduciary duties to the Buyer under this relationship and agreement, including fidelity, honesty, dedication to purpose, acting in the Buyer's best interests, etc. The commission to be paid to the Buyer's Agent in the Buyer Agency Agreement, though ultimately the Buyer's obligation, is generally offset in whole or in part against the share, or "co-op", commission offered by the Listing Agent through the Multiple Listing Service ("MLS").

An exclusive buyer agent is a real estate agent who works for a company that does not ever represent sellers in real estate transactions. Exclusive buyer agents (and their clients) avoid the conflict of interest of working with an agent who promotes their listings or their firm's listings. It is beneficial to a buyer to have representation because the agent is responsible for acquiring information on the property and advising the buyer based on that information. Without an agreement, the agent may not have an obligation to work with the buyer's best interests in mind.

== See also ==
- Exclusive buyer agent or EBA
- Real estate
- Realtor
- Multiple Listing Services
- Estate agent (United Kingdom)
- Buying agent in the UK
- Property finder
