= Real estate agent =

Property sales intermediary

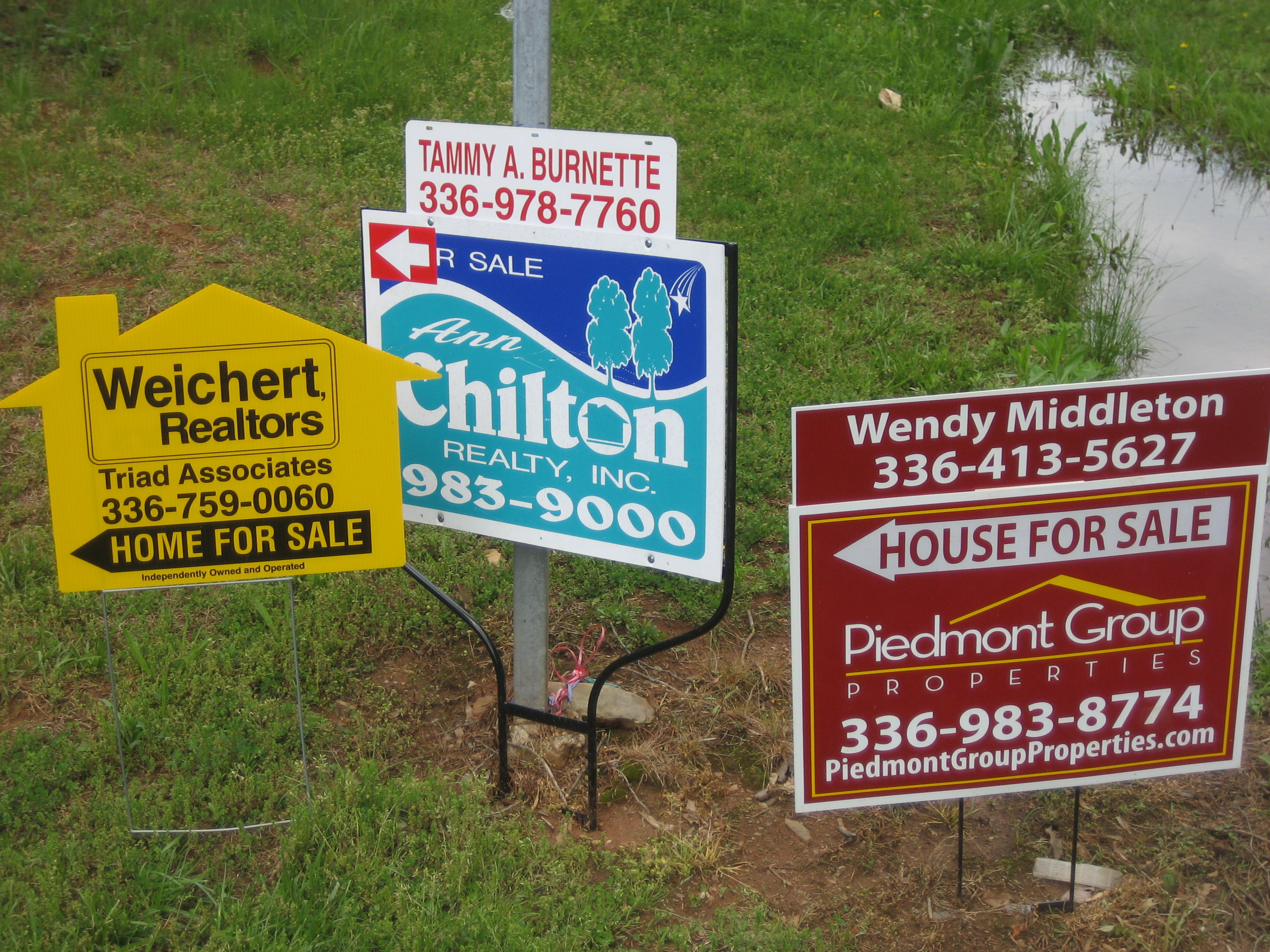
Lawn signs advertising houses for sale

Real estate agents and real estate brokers are people who represent sellers or buyers of real estate or real property. While a broker may work independently, an agent usually works under a licensed broker to represent clients. Brokers and agents are licensed by the state to negotiate sales agreements and manage the documentation required for closing real estate transactions.

== Categories of representation ==
A real estate broker typically receives a real estate commission for successfully completing a sale. Across the U.S., this commission can generally range between 5-6% of the property's sale price for a full-service broker but this percentage varies by state and even region.

== Real estate licensing and education ==
In most jurisdictions in the United States, a person must have a license to perform licensed activities, and these activities are defined within the statutes of each state. The main feature of the requirement for having a license to perform those activities is the work done "for compensation". Hence, hypothetically, if a person wants to help a friend out in either selling or buying a property, and no compensation of any kind is expected in return, then a license is not needed to perform all the work. However, since most people would expect to be compensated for their efforts and skills, a license would be required by law before a person may receive remuneration for services rendered as a real estate broker or agent. Unlicensed activity is illegal and the state real estate commission has the authority to fine people who are acting as real estate licensees, but buyers and sellers acting as principals in the sale or purchase of real estate are usually not required to be licensed. In some states, lawyers handle real estate sales for compensation without being licensed as brokers or agents. However, even lawyers can only perform real estate activities that are incidental to their original work as a lawyer. It cannot be the case that a lawyer can become a seller's selling agent if that is all the service that is being requested by the client. Lawyers would still need to be licensed as a broker if they wish to perform licensed activities. Nevertheless, lawyers do get a break in the minimum education requirements (for example, 90 hours in Illinois).

In all states, the real estate licensee must disclose to prospective buyers and sellers the nature of their relationship

== Specific representation laws ==
Some U.S. state real estate commissions – notably Florida's after 1992 (and extended in 2003) and Colorado's after 1994 (with changes in 2003) created the option of having no agency or fiduciary relationship between brokers and sellers or buyers.

As noted by the South Broward Board of Realtors, Inc. in a letter to State of Florida legislative committees:

"The Transaction Broker crafts a transaction by bringing a willing buyer and a willing seller together and provides the legal documentation of the details of the legal agreement between the same. The Transaction Broker is not a fiduciary of any party, but must abide by the law as well as professional and ethical standards." (such as NAR Code of Ethics).

The result was that, in 2003, Florida created a system where the default brokerage relationship had "all licensees ... operating as transaction brokers, unless a single agent or no brokerage relationship is established, in writing, with the customer" and the statute required written disclosure of the transaction brokerage relationship to the buyer or seller customer only through July 1, 2008. To In the case of both Florida and Colorado, dual agency and sub-agency (where both listing and selling agents represent the seller) no longer exist.

Other brokers and agents may focus on representing buyers or tenants in a real estate transaction. However, licensing as a broker or salesperson authorizes the licensee to legally represent parties on either side of a transaction and providing the necessary documentation for the legal transfer of real property. This business decision is for the licensee to decide. There are fines for people acting as real estate agents when not licensed by the state.

In the United Kingdom, an estate agent is a person or business entity whose business is to market real estate on behalf of clients. There are significant differences between the actions, powers, obligations, and liabilities of brokers and estate agents in each country, as different countries take markedly different approaches to the marketing and selling of real property.

== The difference between salespersons and brokers ==
Before the Multiple Listing Service (MLS) was introduced in 1967, when brokers (and their licensees) only represented sellers by providing a service to provide legal documentation on the transfer of real property, the term "real estate salesperson" may have been more appropriate than it is today, given the various ways that brokers and licensees now help buyers through the legal process of transferring real property. Legally, however, the term "salesperson" is still used in many states to describe a real estate licensee.

=== Real estate broker (or, in some states, qualifying broker) ===
After gaining some years of experience in real estate sales, a salesperson may decide to become licensed as a real estate broker (or Principal/qualifying broker) in order to own, manage, or operate their own brokerage. In addition, some states allow college graduates to apply for a broker's license without years of experience. College graduates fall into this category once they have completed the state-required courses as well. California allows licensed attorneys to become brokers upon passing the broker exam without having to take the requisite courses required of an agent. Commonly more coursework and a broker's state exam on real estate law must be passed. Upon obtaining a broker's license, a real estate agent may continue to work for another broker in a similar capacity as before (often referred to as a broker associate or associate broker) or take charge of their own brokerage and hire other salespersons (or broker licensees). Becoming a branch office manager may or may not require a broker's license. Some states allow licensed attorneys to become real estate brokers without taking any exam. In some states, there are no "salespeople" as all licensees are brokers.

== Real estate brokers and sellers ==
=== Flat-fee and unrepresented real estate transactions ===
Some home buyers or sellers choose to forgo representation and proceed without a real estate agent. In these cases, the unrepresented party assumes full responsibility for navigating the transaction, including showings, negotiations, and paperwork.

For example, some home sellers use “flat-fee brokers” or “limited-service agents” who offer minimal services and avoid establishing a full agency relationship. These agents charge a fixed fee—often around $500—to list the property in the multiple listing service (MLS), while the seller represents themselves during showings and negotiations. This approach reduces total commission costs but limits professional guidance and fiduciary protections associated with full-service agency.

=== Brokerage commissions ===
In consideration of the brokerage successfully finding a buyer for the property, a broker anticipates receiving a commission for the services the brokerage has provided. Usually, the payment of a commission to the brokerage is contingent upon finding a buyer for the real estate, the successful negotiation of a purchase contract between the buyer and seller, or the settlement of the transaction and the exchange of money between buyer and seller. Under common law, a real estate broker is eligible to receive their commission, regardless of whether the sale actually takes place, once they secure a buyer who is ready, willing, and able to purchase the dwelling.

Economist Steven D. Levitt famously argued in his 2005 book Freakonomics that real estate brokers have an inherent conflict of interest with the sellers they represent because their commission gives them more motivation to sell quickly than to sell at a higher price. Levitt supported his argument with a study finding brokers tend to put their own houses on the market for longer and receive higher prices for them compared to when working for their clients. He concluded that broker commissions will be reduced in the future. A 2008 study by other economists found that when comparing brokerages without listing services, brokerages significantly reduced the average sale price.

==== RESPA ====
Real estate brokers who work with lenders can not receive any compensation from the lender for referring a residential client to a specific lender. To do so would be a violation of a United States federal law known as the Real Estate Settlement Procedures Act (RESPA). RESPA ensures that buyers and sellers are given adequate notice of the Real Estate settlement process.

== Realtor ==
In the United States, the term Realtor is trademarked by the National Association of Realtors, which uses it to refer to its active members, who may be real estate agents or brokers. In Canada, the trademark is used by members of the Canadian Real Estate Association. Both organizations prefer the term to be stylized in all-capital letters, and advise against the use of realtor as a generic synonym for real estate agent.

Independent style guides vary on treatment of the term, with most acknowledging the trademark and preferring "real estate agent" as the appropriate generic term. However, the Oxford English Dictionary uses the lowercase "realtor", noting it is proprietary but also in "extended use" to refer to real estate agents generally.

== Continuing education ==
States issue licenses for an annual or multi-year period and require real estate agents and brokers to complete continuing education prior to renewing their licenses. For example, California licensees must complete 45 hours of continuing education every four years in topics such as agency, trust fund handling, consumer protection, fair housing, ethics, and risk management.

== Organizations ==
Several notable groups exist to promote the real estate industry and to assist professionals.

- The National Association of Realtors (NAR)
  - The Realtor Political Action Committee (RPAC) is the lobbying arm of the NAR.
- The National Association of Real Estate Brokers (NAREB)
- The Real Estate Institute of Canada (REIC)
- The Real Estate Roundtable

== Notable agents and brokers ==
- Alice Mason
- Jade Mills
- Joyce Rey

== See also ==
- Buyer brokerage
- Closing (real estate)
- Estate (land)
- Exclusive buyer agent
- Flat-fee MLS
- Home inspection
- Index of real estate articles
- Investment rating for real estate
- Listing contract
- Mortgage broker
- Property manager
- Property Management
- Real estate contract
- Real estate development
- Real estate investing
- Real estate settlement company
- Strata management
