= C. D. Howe Institute =

Canadian non-profit policy research organization

- Formation: 1958
- Type: Public policy think tank, charity
- Headquarters: 110 Yonge Street; Toronto, Ontario, Canada
- Key people: Jeremy Kronick; President and CEO
- Website: www.cdhowe.org

The C. D. Howe Institute (French: Institut C. D. Howe) is a public policy think tank in Toronto, Ontario, Canada. It aims to be distinguished by "research that is nonpartisan, evidence-based, and subject to definitive expert review." The institute's office previously used to be located in the Trader's Bank Building in downtown Toronto. It is now situated at 110 Yonge Street.

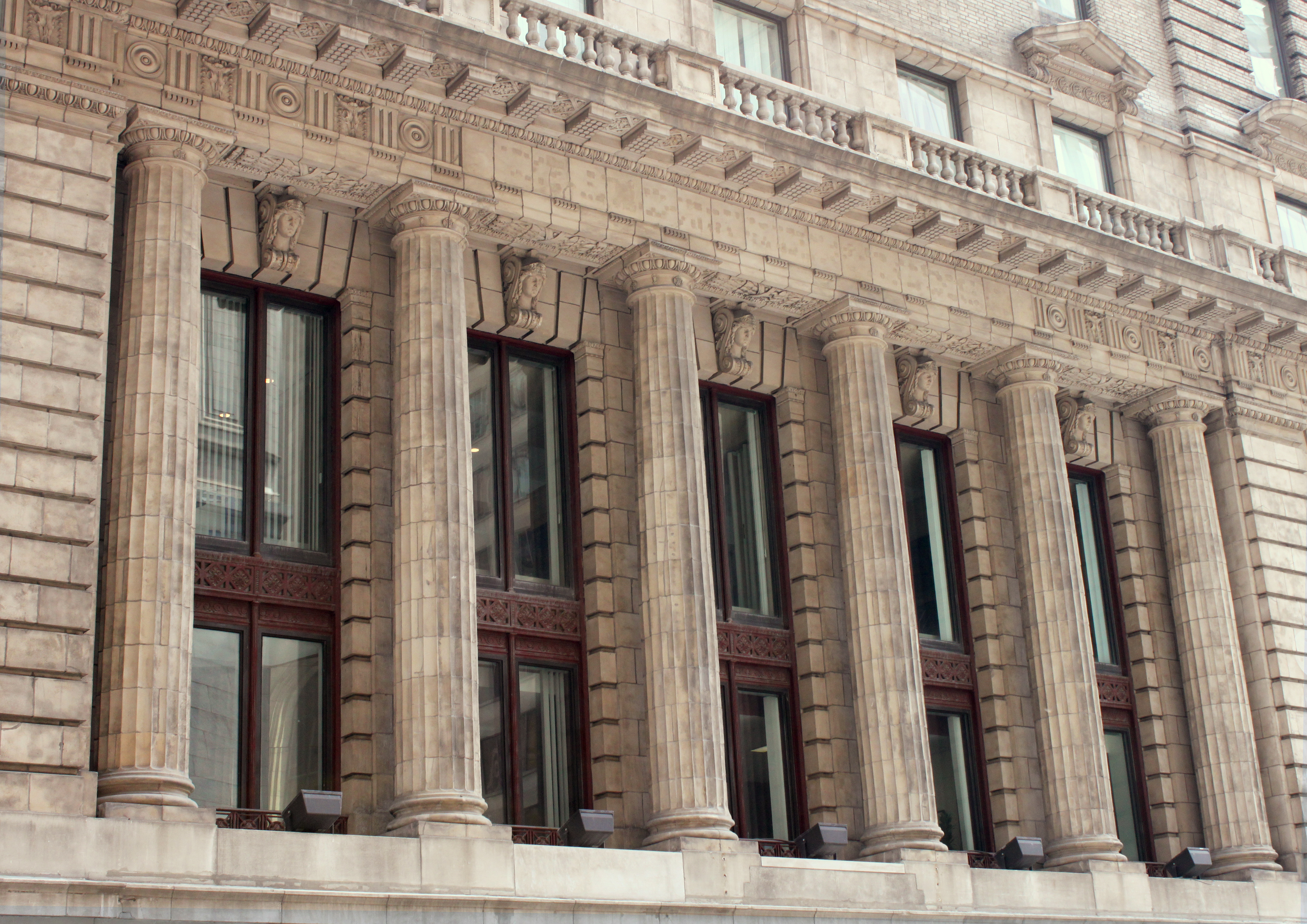
The C. D. Howe Institute's national office was previously located in the Trader's Bank Building at 67 Yonge Street, Toronto

The C. D. Howe Institute publishes research that is national in scope and hosts events across Canada on a wide variety of issues in economic and social policy. Its stated mission is "to raise living standards by fostering economically sound public policies."

== Institute ==
The C. D. Howe Institute's origins go back to Montreal in 1958, when a group of prominent business and labour leaders organized the Private Planning Association of Canada (PPAC) to research and promote educational activities on issues related to public economic policy. In 1973, the PPAC's assets and activities became part of the C. D. Howe Memorial Foundation, created in 1961 to memorialize the late Right Honourable Clarence Decatur Howe. The new organization operated as the C. D. Howe Research Institute until 1982, when the Memorial Foundation chose to focus directly on memorializing C. D. Howe; the institute then adopted its current name: the C. D. Howe Institute.

The institute's research has been cited by Liberal, New Democrat and Conservative members of parliament. The media has described the institute as a centrist, right-wing, conservative, non-partisan, think tank. The institute "is happy to publish papers on either side of the ideological line, provided there is data to back it up." It has been described as having a "deep intellectual grounding to its public-policy approach".

=== Funding ===
The C. D. Howe Institute is a registered Canadian charity, and it accepts donations from individuals, private and public organizations, and charitable foundations. In 2018, 34% of the institute's income was from academic, corporate and individual donations; 23% was from endowments and research grants; and 18% was income from attendee fees and sponsorships.

Since 2016, the institute has received major gifts and grants from:

- Abbott Laboratories
- Accenture
- Advocis
- Alberta Electric System Operator
- Amazon
- Amgen
- Bell Canada
- BIOTECanada
- Canada Mortgage and Housing Corporation
- Canadian Association of Petroleum Producers
- Canadian Life and Health Insurance Association
- Canadian Natural Resources
- Council of Ontario Universities
- Donner Canadian Foundation
- Entertainment Software Association of Canada
- Forest Products Association of Canada
- General Dynamics
- Grant Thornton LLP
- Great-West Life Assurance Company
- Hydro One Networks
- ICICI Bank
- Imperial Oil
- Independent Electricity System Operator
- Insurance Bureau of Canada
- Johnson & Johnson
- Lotte and John Hecht Memorial Foundation
- Manulife
- Mastercard
- Mattamy Homes
- Max Bell Foundation
- OpenText
- Ontario Hospital Association
- Ontario Real Estate Association
- Pharmascience
- Power Corporation of Canada
- Public Health Agency of Canada
- Sun Life Financial
- Telus Health
- Thomson Reuters
- Toronto Metropolitan University Future Skills Centre
- Toronto Regional Real Estate Board
- W. Garfield Weston Foundation

== Research ==
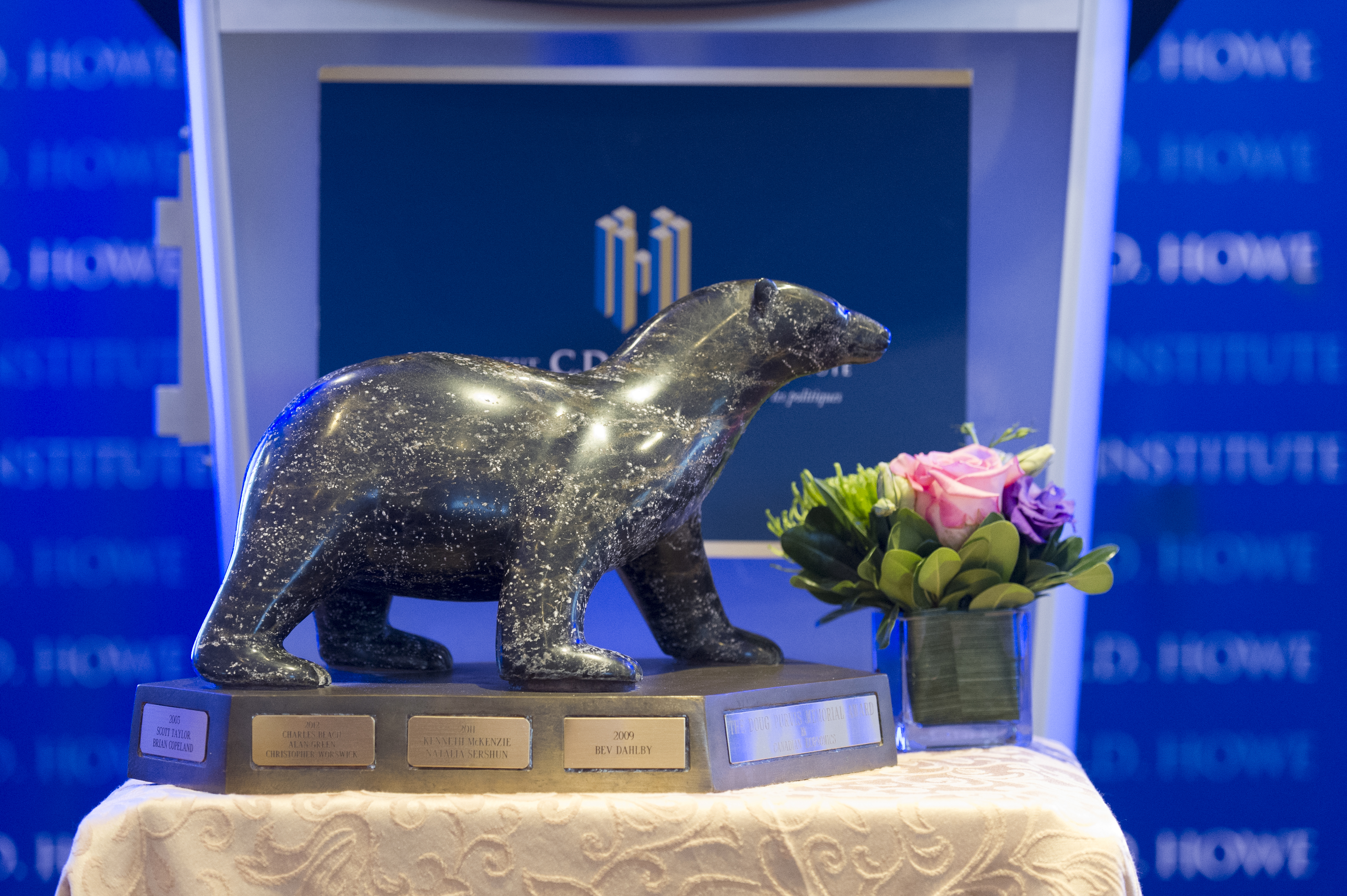
The C. D. Howe Institute's study of immigration policy reform entitled "Toward Improving Canada's Skilled Immigration Policy: An Evaluation Approach", by Charles M. Beach, Alan G. Green and Christopher Worswick won the 2012 Doug Purvis Memorial Prize.

The institute publishes over 60 research reports per year. Major areas of policy research are:

- Business Cycle
- Demographics and Immigration
- Education, Skills and Labour Market
- Energy and Natural Resources
- Financial Services and Regulation
- Fiscal and Tax Policy
- Health Policy
- Industry Regulation and Competition Policy
- Innovation and Business Growth
- Monetary Policy
- Public Governance and Accountability
- Public Investments and Infrastructure
- Retirement Saving and Income
- Trade and International Policy

In March 2015, the institute published a review of provincial and Canadian vaccination policies funded through a $197,950 grant from the Public Health Agency of Canada's Immunization Partnership Fund. A follow-up report focused on childhood immunisation was published in April 2017, and an adult report published in April 2018.

In December 2022, the institute published a review of Canada's COVID-19 vaccination campaign in regards to reduction in cases, hospitalizations and deaths.

== Events ==
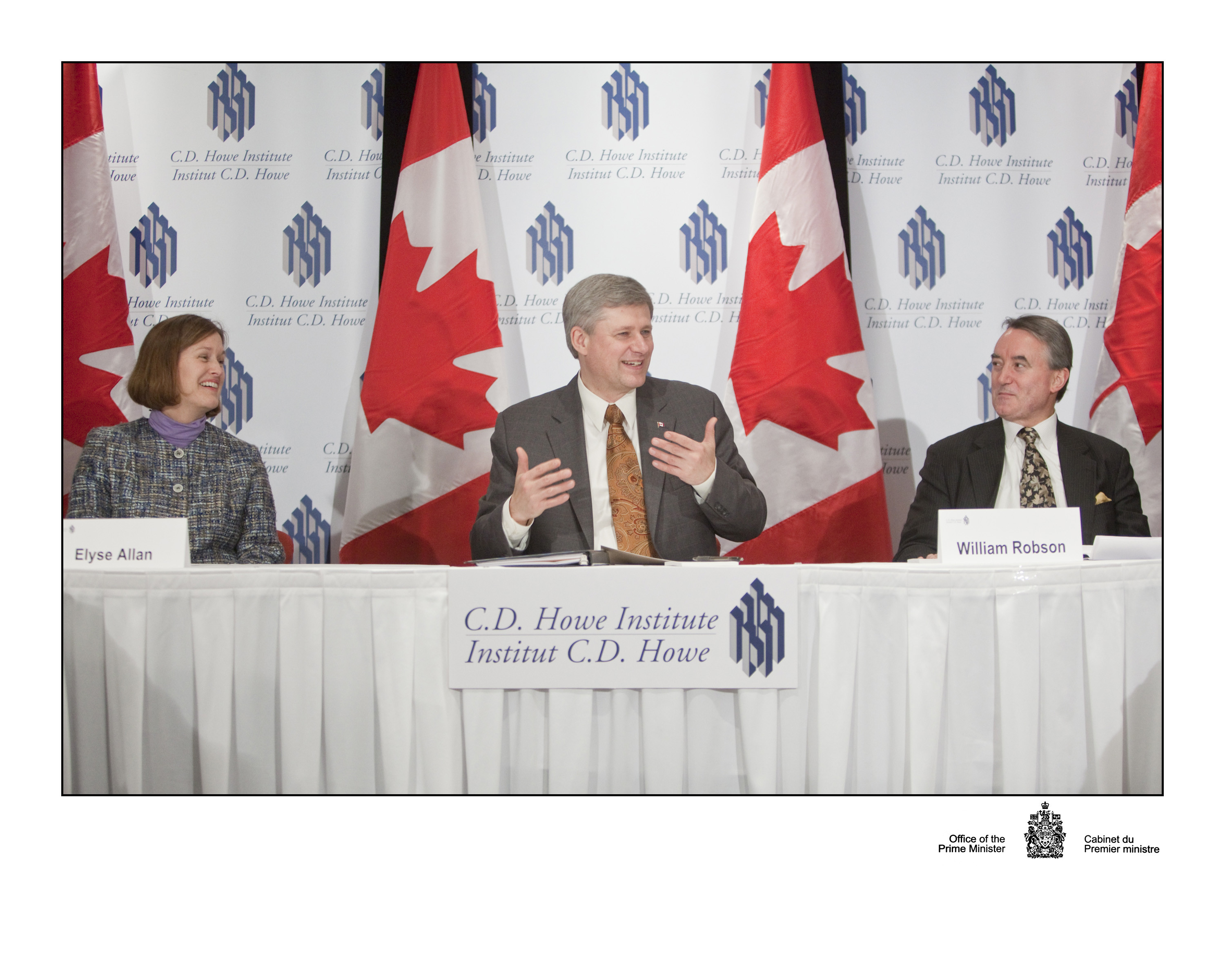
Former Prime Minister of Canada, Stephen Harper, participates in a public policy roundtable at the C. D. Howe Institute.

The institute hosts public policy roundtables and conferences featuring prominent political leaders (including current and former Prime Ministers), Canadian and international policymakers, academics, business leaders and public servants. Over 80 events are held each year.

== Awards ==
Authors of seven C. D. Howe Institute publications have won the Doug Purvis Memorial Prize, which is awarded annually by the Canadian Economics Association to the authors of a highly significant written contribution to Canadian economic policy. (The prize was conferred on Institute contributors in 1994, 1995, 2002, 2010, 2012, 2014 and 2023.) A C. D. Howe Institute title received the Donner Prize in 2004, which is awarded annually by the Donner Canadian Foundation for the best public policy book by a Canadian; the institute's publications were runners-up in 2001, 2005, and 2011.
