= Ottawa Real Estate Board =

The Ottawa Real Estate Board (OREB) is a non-profit professional association of registered real estate brokers and salespeople in the Ottawa, Canada area. OREB was formed in 1919 and incorporated in 1921. In 1982, the name was changed to 'Real Estate Board of Ottawa-Carleton', and was changed back to the 'Ottawa Real Estate Board' in 2000.

OREB has been maintaining statistics of Ottawa house prices since 1956. The average home price in Ottawa in 2008 was $289,766, a 6.35% increase over 2007.

== History ==
Ottawa’s Co-operative Listing service was created in 1949 and the name changed to Multiple Listing Service in 1963.

== Members ==
Members of OREB are registered by the Real Estate Council of Ontario (RECO) to trade in real estate in Ontario.

Members and member offices can be found by using the search function on the home page of its website. All members of the Board are also members of the Ontario Real Estate Association and Canadian Real Estate Association, and as such, are permitted to use the term REALTOR. The REALTOR and MLS trademarks are owned by the Canadian Real Estate Association (CREA).

== Mandate and board services ==
OREB's mission statement is "to foster a professional environment to enable the members to carry out their practice of real estate".

OREB administers Ottawa’s Multiple Listing Service system, which uses the Matrix™ software to allow members to enter and manage their listings.

OREB maintains an up-to-date list of Open Houses for the public.

== See also ==
- Canadian Real Estate Association
- Ontario Real Estate Association
