= Methylphenidate =

Central nervous system stimulant

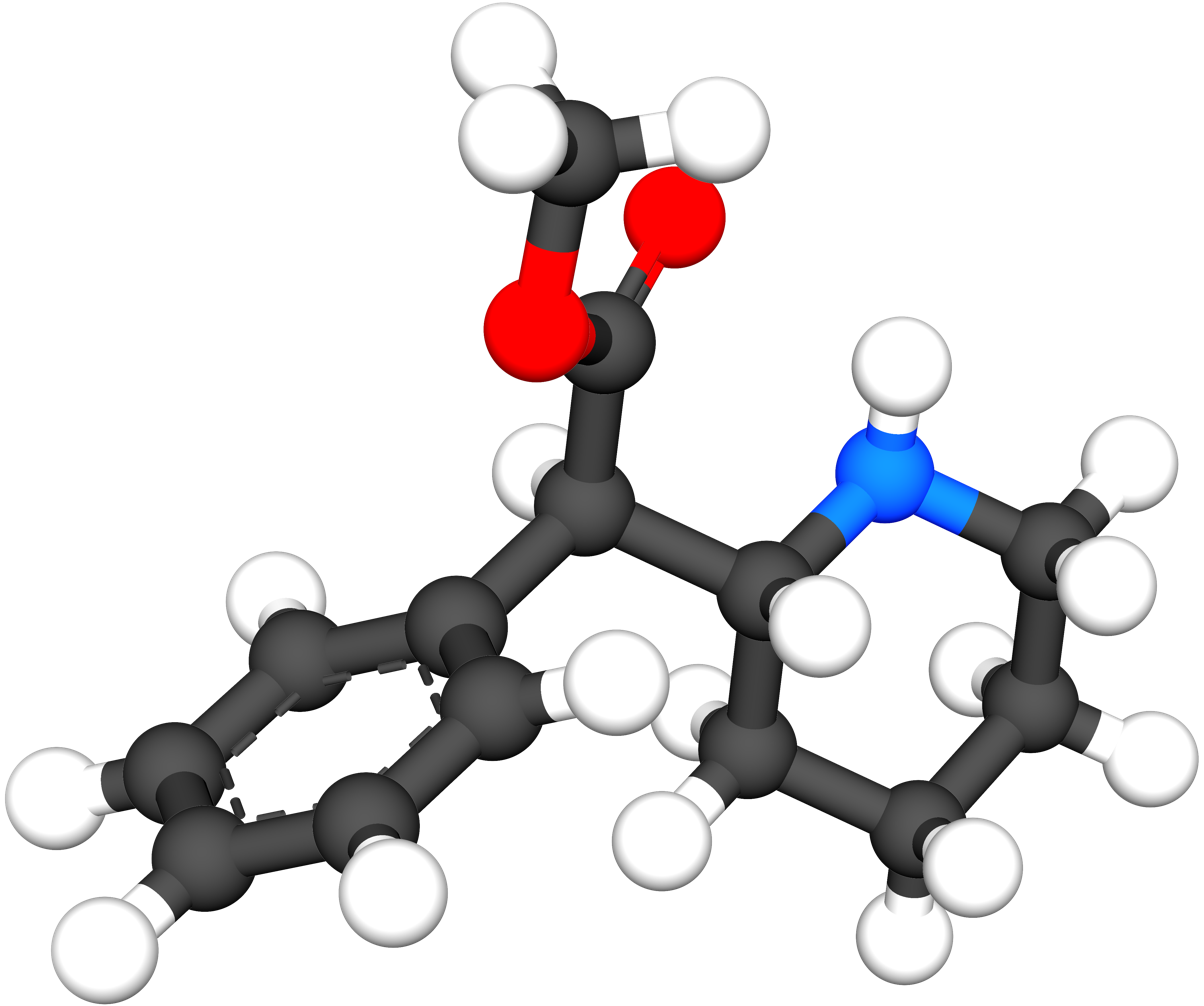

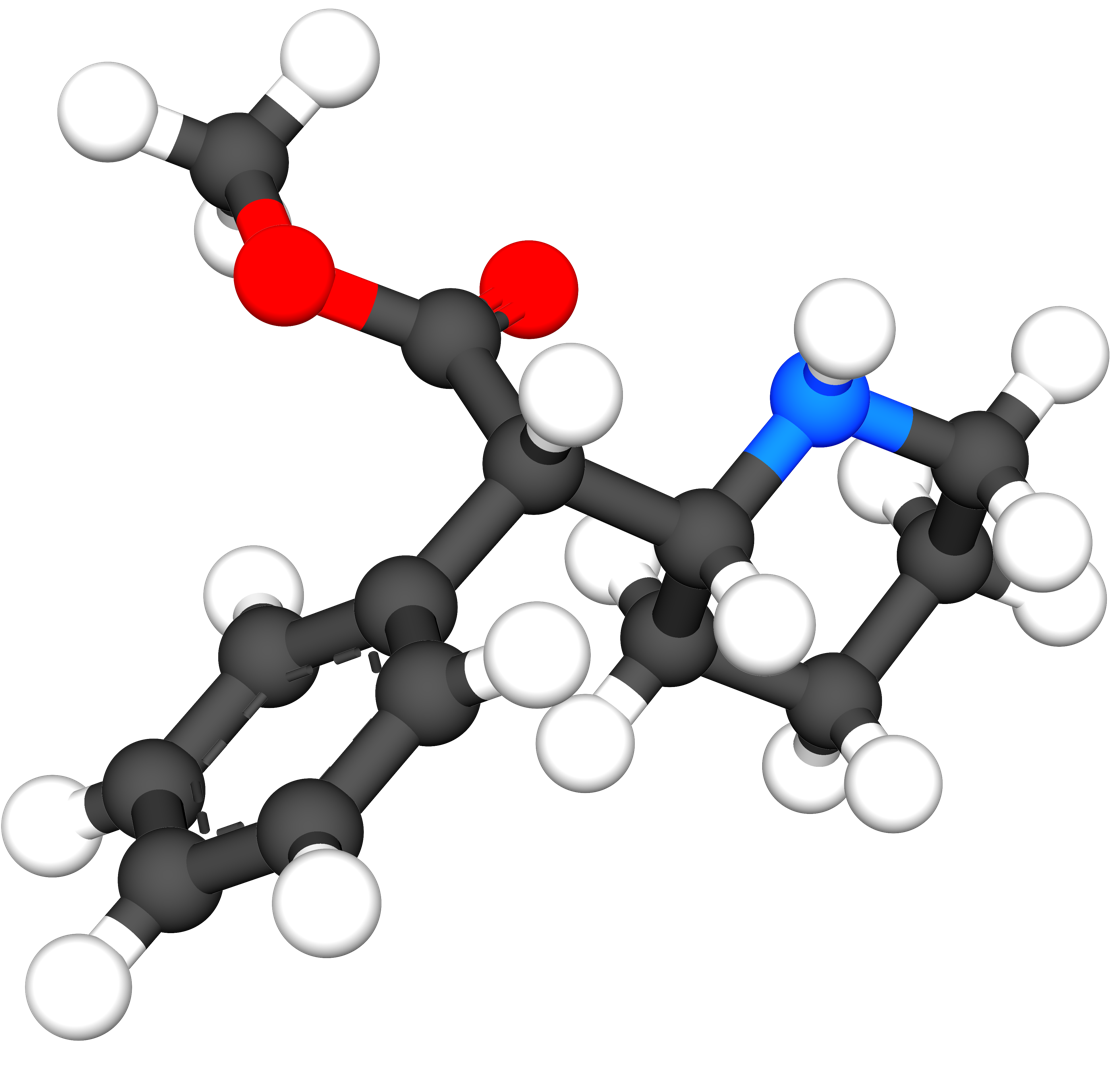

Clinical data
- Pronunciation: /ˌmɛθəlˈfɛnɪdeɪt, -ˈfiː-/
- Trade names: Ritalin, Concerta, others
- Other names: MPH
- AHFS/Drugs.com: Monograph
- MedlinePlus: a682188
- License data: US DailyMed: Methylphenidate
- Pregnancy category: AU: D
- Dependence liability: Physical: None; Psychological: Moderate
- Addiction liability: Moderate
- Routes of administration: Medical: Oral, transdermal Recreational: Oral, insufflation, sublingual, rectal, intravenous
- Drug class: Stimulant; Norepinephrine–dopamine reuptake inhibitor (NDRI)
- ATC code: N06BA04 (WHO)

Legal status
- Legal status: AU: S8 (Controlled drug); BR: Class A3 (Psychoactive drugs); CA: Schedule III; DE: Anlage III (Special prescription form required); NZ: Class B2 -authority required; UK: Class B; US: Schedule II; UN: Psychotropic Schedule II; EU: Rx-only; SE: Förteckning II; MX: Controlled (estupefaciente) (Note: Methylphenidate is legally classified as an estupefaciente under Article 234 of the General Health Law. Prescriptions must use special prescription forms, and treatment may not exceed 30 days.)

Pharmacokinetic data
- Bioavailability: Oral: ~30% (range: 11–52%)
- Protein binding: ~15% (±5%) binds to plasma proteins
- Metabolism: Liver (80%) mostly CES1-mediated
- Metabolites: α-phenyl-2-piperidine acetic acid (ritalinic acid)
- Onset of action: ~20–60 minutes, depending on formulation
- Elimination half-life: 2—3 hours
- Duration of action: IR dosing: 3–4 hours; ER dosing: 8–12 hours
- Excretion: Urine (90%)

Identifiers
- IUPAC name: Methyl phenyl(piperidin-2-yl)acetate
- CAS Number: 20748-11-2
- PubChem CID: 4158
- IUPHAR/BPS: 7236
- DrugBank: DB00422
- ChemSpider: 4015
- UNII: 207ZZ9QZ49
- KEGG: D04999
- ChEBI: CHEBI:6887
- ChEMBL: ChEMBL796
- CompTox Dashboard (EPA): DTXSID5023299
- ECHA InfoCard: 100.003.662

Chemical and physical data
- Formula: C_{14}H_{19}NO_{2}
- Molar mass: 233.311 g·mol^{−1}
- 3D model (JSmol): Interactive image
- Melting point: 74 °C (165 °F)
- Boiling point: 136 °C (277 °F)
- SMILES: COC(=O)C(c1ccccc1)C1CCCCN1
- InChI: InChI=1S/C14H19NO2/c1-17-14(16)13(11-7-3-2-4-8-11)12-9-5-6-10-15-12/h2-4,7-8,12-13,15H,5-6,9-10H2,1H3; Key:DUGOZIWVEXMGBE-UHFFFAOYSA-N

Methylphenidate, sold under the brand names Ritalin and Concerta, (Note: Concerta is an extended-release formulation.) among others, is a central nervous system (CNS) stimulant used in the treatment of attention deficit hyperactivity disorder (ADHD) and narcolepsy. It may be taken by mouth or applied to the skin, and different formulations have varying durations of effect. For ADHD, the effectiveness of methylphenidate is comparable to atomoxetine but modestly lower than amphetamine. However, methylphenidate is preferred as a first-line treatment in children, while amphetamine is preferred in adults. Methylphenidate reduces core ADHD symptoms and may do so in part by enhancing executive functions, such as working memory, sustained attention, and inhibitory control.

At therapeutic doses, methylphenidate increases alertness and concentration and reduces hyperactivity and impulsive behavior in people with ADHD. Common side effects include loss of appetite, weight loss, trouble sleeping, and small increases in heart rate and blood pressure. Long-term treatment in children has been associated with slightly slower growth. Methylphenidate can be misused; dependence and withdrawal are mainly reported with high-dose or non-medical use and are uncommon at therapeutic doses.

Methylphenidate is believed to work by blocking the reuptake of dopamine and norepinephrine by neurons. It is a CNS stimulant of the phenethylamine and piperidine classes. It is available as a generic medication. In 2023, it was the 50th most commonly prescribed medication in the United States, with more than 13 million prescriptions.

== Uses ==
=== Medical ===
Methylphenidate is most commonly used to treat attention deficit hyperactivity disorder (ADHD) and narcolepsy.

==== Attention deficit hyperactivity disorder ====
The dosage may vary and is titrated to effect, with some guidelines recommending initial treatment with a low dose. Methylphenidate is available in both immediate-release and modified-release formulations. Methylphenidate is not approved for children under six years of age.

The International Consensus Statement on ADHD shows that the results from systematic reviews, meta-analyses and large scale studies are clear: methylphenidate is safe and among the most efficacious drugs in all of medicine; treatment in the long-term substantially reduces accidental injuries, traumatic brain injury, substance abuse, cigarette smoking, educational underachievement, bone fractures, sexually transmitted infections, depression, suicide, criminal activity, teenage pregnancy, vehicle crashes, burn injuries and overall-cause mortality, and eliminates the increased risk for obesity.

One committee from the World Health Organization (WHO) responsible for the World Health Organization Essential Medicines List rejected an application in 2019, and a second application endorsed by 51 professional medical groups in 2021, for methylphenidate's inclusion due to uncertainty about its efficacy and safety. However, in November 2023, the WHO Mental Health Gap Action Programme Guidelines for mental, neurological, and substance use disorders recommended that methylphenidate should be considered for children aged 6 years and older who have ADHD, noting specifically that, "methylphenidate treatment shows substantial effects on symptom reduction", in addition to other WHO publications. In 2024, the European Society for Child and Adolescent Psychiatry (ESCAP) and the American Academy of Paediatrics (AAP) endorsed the inclusion of methylphenidate in the WHO EML. A new application for methylphenidate's inclusion is currently pending review, having sparked debate in the comment process among researchers engaged in the evaluation of the evidence-base.

Safety and efficacy data have been reviewed extensively by medical regulators (e.g., the US Food and Drug Administration and the European Medicines Agency), the developers of evidence-based national guidelines (e.g., the UK National Institute for Health and Care Excellence and the American Academy of Pediatrics), and government agencies who have endorsed these guidelines (e.g., the Australian National Health and Medical Research Council). These professional groups unanimously conclude, based on the scientific evidence, that methylphenidate is safe and effective and should be considered as a first-line treatment for ADHD.

Since the diagnosis of ADHD has increased around the world, methylphenidate may be misused as a "study drug" by students, which may be harmful. This also applies to people who may be experiencing a different issue and are misdiagnosed with ADHD. People in this category are prone to experience the adverse effects of the drug, which can worsen their condition.

Long-term meta-analyses and systematic reviews show that the medications used to treat ADHD are not associated with observed deficits in brain structure, but with improved brain development and functioning, most prominently in inferior frontal and striatal regions. The most comprehensive meta-analysis available (19 studies with over 3.9 million participants) found "no statistically significant association between ADHD medications [including methylphenidate] and the risk of cardiovascular event among children and adolescents, young and middle-aged adults, or older adults"; as do other systematic reviews and meta-analyses.

==== Narcolepsy ====
Narcolepsy, a chronic sleep disorder characterized by overwhelming daytime drowsiness and uncontrollable sleep, is treated primarily with stimulants. Methylphenidate is considered effective in increasing wakefulness, vigilance, and performance. Methylphenidate improves measures of somnolence on standardized tests, such as the Multiple Sleep Latency Test (MSLT), but performance does not improve to levels comparable to healthy people.

==== Other medical uses ====
Methylphenidate may also be prescribed for off-label use in treatment-resistant cases of bipolar disorder and major depressive disorder. It can also improve depression in several groups, including stroke, cancer, and HIV-positive patients. There is weak evidence in favor of methylphenidate's effectiveness for depression, including providing additional benefit in combination with antidepressants. In individuals with terminal cancer, methylphenidate can be used to counteract opioid-induced somnolence, to increase the analgesic effects of opioids, to treat depression, and to improve cognitive function. A 2021 systematic review and meta-analysis found that all studies on geriatric depression reported positive results of methylphenidate use; the review recommended short-term use in combination with citalopram. A 2018 review found low-quality evidence supporting its use to treat apathy as seen in Alzheimer's disease, in addition to slight benefits for cognition and cognitive performance.

=== Enhancing performance ===
Methylphenidate's efficacy as an athletic performance enhancer, cognitive enhancer, aphrodisiac, and euphoriant is supported by research. However, the manner in which methylphenidate is used for these purposes (high dosages, alternate routes of administration, during sleep deprivation, etc.) can result in severe unintended side effects.

A 2015 review found that therapeutic doses of amphetamine and methylphenidate result in modest improvements in cognition, including working memory, episodic memory, and inhibitory control, in normal healthy adults; (Note: The procognitive actions of psychostimulants are only associated with low doses ... cognition-enhancing effects of psychostimulants involve the preferential elevation of catecholamines in the PFC and the subsequent activation of norepinephrine α2 and dopamine D1 receptors. ... This differential modulation of PFC-dependent processes across dose appears to be associated with the differential involvement of noradrenergic α2 versus α1 receptors.) (Note: The results of this meta-analysis ... do confirm the reality of cognitive enhancing effects for normal healthy adults in general, while also indicating that these effects are modest in size.) the cognition-enhancing effects of these drugs are known to occur through the indirect activation of both dopamine receptor D_{1} and adrenoceptor α_{2} in the prefrontal cortex. Methylphenidate and other ADHD stimulants also improve task saliency and increase arousal. Stimulants such as amphetamine and methylphenidate can improve performance on difficult and boring tasks, (Note: Therapeutic (relatively low) doses of psychostimulants, such as methylphenidate and amphetamine, improve performance on working memory tasks both in normal subjects and those with ADHD ... [It] is now believed that dopamine and norepinephrine, but not serotonin, produce the beneficial effects of stimulants on working memory. At abused (relatively high) doses, stimulants can interfere with working memory and cognitive control ... stimulants act not only on working memory function, but also on general levels of arousal and, within the nucleus accumbens, improve the saliency of tasks. Thus, stimulants improve performance on effortful but tedious tasks ... through indirect stimulation of dopamine and norepinephrine receptors.) and are used by some students as a study and test-taking aid. Based upon studies of self-reported illicit stimulant use, performance-enhancing use rather than use as a recreational drug, is the primary reason that students use stimulants.

Excessive doses of methylphenidate, above the therapeutic range, could interfere with working memory and cognitive control. Methylphenidate increases stamina and endurance in humans primarily through reuptake inhibition of dopamine in the central nervous system. Similar to the loss of cognitive enhancement when using large amounts, large doses of methylphenidate could induce side effects that impair athletic performance, such as rhabdomyolysis and hyperthermia. While literature suggests it might improve cognition, there isn't evidence that its use as a study aid without an ADHD diagnosis improves one's GPA.

=== Available forms ===
The most common formulations of methylphenidate are based on its hydrochloride salt and are available as both immediate-release and extended-release oral dosage forms, as well as transdermal patches. Methylphenidate is a chiral compound with two stereocenters; clinical use overwhelmingly utilizes the racemate threo diastereomer, with the pharmacologically active component being the d-threo-methylphenidate enantiomer. Additionally, dexmethylphenidate (Focalin) is the single d-threo enantiomer formulation approved for medicinal use. There is some evidence that dexmethylphenidate has better bioavailability and a longer duration of action than methylphenidate.

==== Immediate-release ====
In the Ritalin tablets series (Ritalin, Ritalin LA, Ritalin SR), the volume of distribution was 2.65±1.11 L/kg for d-methylphenidate and 1.80±0.91 L/kg for l-methylphenidate after swallowing. Following administration of Concerta, plasma concentrations of the l-isomer were approximately 1/40 the plasma concentrations of the d-isomer.

Methylphenidate was originally available as an immediate-release racemic mixture formulation under the Novartis brand name Ritalin, although a variety of generics are available, some under other brand names. Generic brand names include Ritalina, Rilatine, Attenta, Medikinet, Metadate, Methylin, Penid, Tranquilyn, and Rubifen.

==== Modified-release ====
Modified-release methylphenidate products are formulations designed to deliver methylphenidate in two distinct phases, a rapid initial release followed by a slower, extended release—to maintain therapeutic concentrations over several hours, reducing the need for multiple daily dosing. These products include a range of brand names such as Concerta XL, Medikinet XL, Equasym XL, and Ritalin LA, each with different ratios of immediate-release to modified-release components and varying duration of action from 8 to 12 hours.

==== Skin patch ====
A methylphenidate skin patch is sold under the brand name Daytrana in the United States. It was developed and marketed by Noven Pharmaceuticals and approved in the US in 2006. It is also referred to as methylphenidate transdermal system (MTS). It is approved as a once-daily treatment in children with ADHD aged 6–17 years. It is mainly prescribed as a second-line treatment when oral forms are not well tolerated or if people have difficulty with compliance. Noven's original FDA submission indicated that it should be used for 12 hours. When the FDA rejected the submission, they requested evidence that a shorter time period was safe and effective; Noven provided such evidence, and it was approved for 9 hours.

Orally administered methylphenidate is subject to first-pass metabolism, by which the levo-isomer is extensively metabolized. By circumventing this first-pass metabolism, the relative concentrations of ℓ-threo-methylphenidate are much higher with transdermal administration (50–60% of those of dexmethylphenidate instead of about 14–27%).

A 39 nanograms/mL peak serum concentration of methylphenidate has been found to occur between 7.5–10.5 hours after administration. However, the onset to peak effect is 2 hours, and the clinical effects remain up to 2 hours after the patch has been removed. The absorption is increased when the transdermal patch is applied to inflamed skin or skin that has been exposed to heat. The absorption lasts for approximately 9 hours after application (onto normal, unexposed to heat and uninflamed skin). 90% of the medication is excreted in the urine as metabolites and the unchanged drug.

==== Parenteral formulation ====
When it was released in the United States, methylphenidate was available from CIBA in a parenteral form for use by medical professionals. It came in 10mL multiple-dose vials containing 100 mg methylphenidate HCl and 100 mg lactose in lyophilized (freeze-dried) form. It was also available as single-dose ampoules containing 20 mg methylphenidate HCl. Instructions were to reconstitute with 10mL sterile solvent (water). The indication was 10 to 20 mg (1.0mL from MDV's, up to one full single-use ampoule) to produce a focused, talkative state that could help certain patients break down the resistance to therapy. Parenteral methylphenidate was discontinued out of concern for the actual benefit and for inducing a psychic dependence. This is not truth serum in the normal sense, as it does not impair the ability to control the flow of information like a barbiturate agent (Pentothal) or similar might.

== Contraindications ==
Methylphenidate is contraindicated for individuals with agitation, tics, glaucoma, heart defects, or a hypersensitivity to any ingredients contained in methylphenidate pharmaceuticals.

Pregnant women are advised to take methylphenidate only if the benefits outweigh the potential risks. Not enough human studies have been conducted to conclusively demonstrate an effect of methylphenidate on fetal development. In 2018, a review concluded that it has not been teratogenic in rats and rabbits, and that it "is not a major human teratogen".

== Adverse effects ==
Addiction experts in psychiatry, chemistry, pharmacology, forensic science, epidemiology, and the police and legal services engaged in delphic analysis regarding 20 popular recreational drugs. Methylphenidate was ranked 13th in dependence, 12th in physical harm, and 18th in social harm.

The most common side effects associated with methylphenidate (in standard and extended-release formulations) are appetite loss, dry mouth, anxiety/nervousness, nausea, and insomnia. Gastrointestinal adverse effects may include abdominal pain and weight loss. Nervous system adverse effects may include bruxism, akathisia (agitation/restlessness), irritability, dyskinesia (tics), lethargy (drowsiness/fatigue), and dizziness. Cardiac adverse effects may include palpitations, changes in blood pressure and heart rate (typically mild), and tachycardia (rapid heart rate). Ophthalmologic adverse effects may include blurred vision and dry eyes, with less frequent reports of diplopia and mydriasis. In some cases, tolerance might be an issue with stimulants like methylphenidate.

Results from a 2024 systematic review showed that methylphenidate significantly improves ADHD symptoms and broadband measures but can cause appetite suppression and other adverse events in children and adolescents. Smokers with ADHD who take methylphenidate may increase their nicotine dependence, and smoke more often than before they began using methylphenidate, with increased nicotine cravings and an average increase of 1.3 cigarettes per day.

There is some evidence of mild reductions in height with prolonged treatment in children. This has been estimated at 1 centimetre (0.4 in) or less per year during the first three years with a total decrease of 3 centimetres (1.2 in) over 10 years.

Hypersensitivity (including skin rash, urticaria, and fever) is sometimes reported when using transdermal methylphenidate. The Daytrana patch has a much higher rate of skin reactions than oral methylphenidate.

Methylphenidate can worsen psychosis in people who are psychotic, and in very rare cases it has been associated with the emergence of new psychotic symptoms. It should be used with extreme caution in people with bipolar disorder due to the potential induction of mania or hypomania. There have been very rare reports of suicidal ideation. Some authors claim that evidence does not support a link. Logorrhea is occasionally reported, and visual hallucinations are very rarely reported. Priapism is a very rare adverse event that can be potentially serious.

U.S. Food and Drug Administration–commissioned studies in 2011 indicate that in children, young adults, and adults, there is no association between serious adverse cardiovascular events (sudden death, heart attack, and stroke) and the medical use of methylphenidate or other ADHD stimulants.

Because some adverse effects may only emerge during chronic use of methylphenidate, a constant watch for adverse effects is recommended.

A 2018 Cochrane review found the drug "may be associated with a number of serious adverse events as well as a large number of non‐serious adverse events in children and adolescents". It stated "it is not possible to accurately estimate the actual risk of adverse events" because the quality of evidence in the 260 studies assessed was "very low". (Note: "Our findings suggest that methylphenidate may be associated with a number of serious adverse events as well as a large number of non-serious adverse events in children." "Concerning adverse events associated with the treatment, our systematic review of randomised clinical trials (RCTs) demonstrated no increase in serious adverse events, but a high proportion of participants suffered a range of non-serious adverse events.")

=== Overdose ===
The symptoms of a moderate acute overdose of methylphenidate primarily arise from central nervous system overstimulation; these symptoms include: vomiting, nausea, agitation, tremors, hyperreflexia, muscle twitching, euphoria, dysphoria, confusion, hallucinations, delirium, hyperthermia, sweating, flushing, headache, tachycardia, heart palpitations, cardiac arrhythmias, hypertension, mydriasis, and dryness of mucous membranes. A severe overdose may involve symptoms such as hyperpyrexia, sympathomimetic toxidrome, convulsions, paranoia, stereotypy (a repetitive movement disorder), rhabdomyolysis, coma, and circulatory collapse. (Note: The management of amphetamine, dextroamphetamine, and methylphenidate overdose is largely supportive, with a focus on interruption of the sympathomimetic syndrome with judicious use of benzodiazepines. In cases where agitation, delirium, and movement disorders are unresponsive to benzodiazepines, second-line therapies include antipsychotics such as ziprasidone or haloperidol, central alpha-adrenoreceptor agonists such as dexmedetomidine, or propofol. ... However, fatalities are rare with appropriate care.) A methylphenidate overdose is rarely fatal with appropriate care. Following injection of methylphenidate tablets into an artery, severe toxic reactions involving abscess formation and necrosis have been reported.

Treatment of a methylphenidate overdose typically involves the administration of benzodiazepines, with antipsychotics, α-adrenoceptor agonists and propofol serving as second-line therapies.

=== Addiction and dependence ===
Methylphenidate displays addiction and dependence liability similar to that of amphetamine. It has moderate liability among addictive drugs; addiction and psychological dependence may occur, particularly when methylphenidate is used at high doses or in non-medical contexts. Methylphenidate has the potential to induce euphoria due to its pharmacodynamic effect (i.e., dopamine reuptake inhibition) in the brain's reward system. At therapeutic doses, ADHD stimulants do not sufficiently activate the reward system; consequently, when taken as directed in doses that are commonly prescribed for the treatment of ADHD, methylphenidate use lacks the capacity to cause an addiction. Non-medical routes of administration, such as intranasal insufflation (snorting) or intravenous injection, produce a more rapid increase in brain methylphenidate concentrations than oral administration and are associated with greater subjective euphoria, reinforcing effects, and abuse potential.

==== Biomolecular mechanisms ====
Repeated high-dose administration of methylphenidate has been shown to induce the expression of ΔFosB in D1-type medium spiny neurons of the nucleus accumbens, with accumbal ΔFosB levels accumulating over the long-term with chronic exposure due to its unusually long half-life. Overexpression (i.e., a persistently excessive level of gene expression) of ΔFosB in this subset of neurons is a necessary and sufficient biomolecular mechanism for many of the neural adaptations and reward-related behavioral changes associated with drug addiction (e.g., reward sensitization and compulsive drug self-administration).

== Interactions ==
Methylphenidate may inhibit the metabolism of vitamin K anticoagulants, certain anticonvulsants, and some antidepressants (tricyclic antidepressants, and selective serotonin reuptake inhibitors). Concomitant administration may require dose adjustments, possibly assisted by monitoring of plasma drug concentrations. There are several case reports of methylphenidate inducing serotonin syndrome with concomitant administration of antidepressants.

When methylphenidate is coingested with ethanol, a small amount of ethylphenidate is formed through CES1-mediated transesterification. At therapeutic doses, ethylphenidate is generally a minor metabolite, with most of the metabolite formed being the pharmacologically less active l-isomer. However, ethanol also increases exposure to pharmacologically active d-methylphenidate, and the potential contribution of d-ethylphenidate may become more relevant at high or abusive doses. Therefore, ethylphenidate should not be assumed to be pharmacologically negligible in methylphenidate-ethanol overdose.

Coingestion of alcohol also increases the blood plasma levels of d-methylphenidate by up to 40%.

Liver toxicity from methylphenidate is extremely rare, but limited evidence suggests that intake of β-adrenergic agonists with methylphenidate may increase the risk of liver toxicity.

== Pharmacology ==
=== Pharmacodynamics ===
Binding profile
Neurotransmitter transporter	Measure (units)	dl-MPH	d-MPH	l-MPH
DAT	K_{i} (nM)	121	161	2250
DAT	IC_{50} (nM)	20	23	1600
NET	K_{i} (nM)	788	206	>10000
NET	IC_{50} (nM)	51	39	980
SERT	K_{i} (nM)	>10000	>10000	>6700
SERT	IC_{50} (nM)	—	>10000	>10000
GPCR	Measure (units)	dl-MPH	d-MPH	l-MPH
5-HT_{1A}	K_{i} (nM)	5000	3400	>10000
5-HT_{1A}	IC_{50} (nM)	10000	6800	>10000
5-HT_{2B}	K_{i} (nM)	>10000	4700	>10000
5-HT_{2B}	IC_{50} (nM)	>10000	4900	>10000

Methylphenidate acts primarily as a norepinephrine–dopamine reuptake inhibitor (NDRI). It is a benzylpiperidine and phenethylamine derivative which also shares part of its basic structure with catecholamines.

Methylphenidate is a psychostimulant and increases the activity of the central nervous system through inhibition on reuptake of the neurotransmitters norepinephrine and dopamine. As models of attention deficit hyperactivity disorder (ADHD) suggest, it is associated with functional impairments in some of the brain's neurotransmitter systems, particularly those involving dopamine in the mesocortical and mesolimbic pathways and norepinephrine in the prefrontal cortex and locus coeruleus. Psychostimulants like methylphenidate and amphetamine may be effective in treating ADHD because they increase neurotransmitter activity in these systems. When reuptake of those neurotransmitters is halted, its concentration and effects in the synapse increase and last longer, respectively. Therefore, methylphenidate is called a norepinephrine–dopamine reuptake inhibitor. By increasing the effects of norepinephrine and dopamine, methylphenidate increases the activity of the central nervous system and produces effects such as increased alertness, reduced fatigue, and improved attention.

Methylphenidate is most active at modulating levels of dopamine (DA) and to a lesser extent norepinephrine (NE). Methylphenidate binds to and blocks dopamine transporters (DAT) and norepinephrine transporters (NET). In vitro binding assays generally indicate greater affinity for DAT than NET; however, human PET studies demonstrate substantial occupancy of both transporters, with inter-study comparison suggesting slightly greater NET than DAT occupancy at clinically relevant doses. Variability exists between the extent of DAT blockade and increases in extracellular dopamine, leading to the hypothesis that methylphenidate amplifies basal dopamine activity as an explanation for nonresponse in individuals with low basal DA activity. In animals and brain tissue, methylphenidate has been shown to dose-dependently increase brain dopamine levels. On average, methylphenidate elicits a 3 to 4 times increase in dopamine and norepinephrine in the striatum and prefrontal cortex. Magnetic resonance imaging (MRI) studies suggest that long-term treatment with ADHD stimulants (specifically, amphetamine and methylphenidate) decreases abnormalities in brain structure and function found in subjects with ADHD. (Note: Basal ganglia regions like the right globus pallidus, the right putamen, and the nucleus caudatus are structurally affected in children with ADHD. These changes in limbic regions, such as the ACC and amygdala, are more pronounced in untreated populations and appear to diminish over time from childhood to adulthood. Treatment seems to have positive effects on brain structure.)

Both amphetamine and methylphenidate are predominantly dopaminergic drugs, yet their mechanisms of action are distinct. Methylphenidate acts as a norepinephrine–dopamine reuptake inhibitor, while amphetamine is both a releasing agent and reuptake inhibitor of dopamine and norepinephrine. Methylphenidate's mechanism of action in the release of dopamine and norepinephrine is fundamentally different from most other phenethylamine derivatives, as methylphenidate is thought to increase neuronal firing rate, whereas amphetamine reduces firing rate, but causes monoamine release by reversing the flow of the monoamines through monoamine transporters via a diverse set of mechanisms, including TAAR1 activation and modulation of VMAT2 function, among other mechanisms.

The difference in mechanism of action between methylphenidate and amphetamine results in methylphenidate inhibiting amphetamine's effects on monoamine transporters when they are co-administered.

Methylphenidate has both dopamine transporter and norepinephrine transporter binding affinity, with the dextromethylphenidate enantiomers displaying a prominent affinity for the norepinephrine transporter. Both the dextrorotary and levorotary enantiomers displayed receptor affinity for the serotonergic 5-HT_{1A} and 5-HT_{2B} subtypes, though direct binding to the serotonin transporter was not observed. A later study confirmed the d-threo-methylphenidate (dexmethylphenidate) binding to the 5-HT_{1A} receptor, but no significant activity on the 5-HT_{2B} receptor was found.

The activity of methylphenidate and cocaine as a DAT inhibitors may be different than that of "atypical DAT inhibitors" such as bupropion and modafinil. Methylphenidate and cocaine appear to stabilize the dopamine transporter in an outward-facing conformation, compared to the more inward-facing conformation preferred by atypical DAT inhibitors. This outward-facing stabilization is achieved by breaking a hydrogen bond between amino acid residues critical to the transition of the DAT to an occluded state. Compared to typical DAT inhibitors like methylphenidate, atypical inhibitors generally produce less pronounced reinforcing effects.

Methylphenidate may protect neurons from the neurotoxic effects of Parkinson's disease and methamphetamine use disorder. The hypothesized mechanism of neuroprotection is through inhibition of methamphetamine–DAT interactions, and through reducing cytosolic dopamine, leading to decreased production of dopamine-related reactive oxygen species.

The dextrorotary enantiomers are significantly more potent than the levorotary enantiomers, and some medications therefore only contain dexmethylphenidate. The studied maximized daily dosage of OROS methylphenidate appears to be 144 mg/day.

=== Pharmacokinetics ===
Methylphenidate taken by mouth has a bioavailability of 11–52% with a duration of action around 2–4 hours for immediate-release (IR) (i.e., Ritalin), 3–8 hours for sustained-release (i.e., Ritalin LA), and 8–12 hours for extended-release (ER) (i.e., Concerta). The half-life of methylphenidate is 2–3 hours, depending on the individual. The peak plasma time is achieved at about 2 hours. Methylphenidate has a low plasma protein binding of 10–33% and a volume of distribution of 2.65 L/kg.

d-Methylphenidate is much more bioavailable than l-methylphenidate when administered orally, and is primarily responsible for the psychoactivity of racemic methylphenidate.

The oral bioavailability and speed of absorption for immediate-release methylphenidate is increased when administered with a meal. The effects of a high fat meal on the observed C_{max} differ between some extended-release formulations, with combined IR/ER and OROS formulations showing reduced C_{max} levels while liquid-based extended-release formulations showed increased C_{max} levels when administered with a high-fat meal, according to some researchers. A 2003 study, however, showed no difference between a high-fat meal administration and a fasting administration of oral methylphenidate.

Methylphenidate is metabolized into ritalinic acid by CES1A1 enzymes in the liver. Dextromethylphenidate is selectively metabolized at a slower rate than levomethylphenidate. 97% of the metabolised drug is excreted in the urine, and between 1 and 3% is excreted in the faeces. A small amount, less than 1%, of the drug is excreted in the urine in its unchanged form.

== Chemistry ==
Despite the claim made by some urban legends, methylphenidate is not a cocaine derivative nor analogue. However, both compounds contain a methyl piperidinylcarboxylate moiety with 2-carbon distance between nitrogen and ester, methylphenidate containing methyl (piperidin-2-yl)-ethanoate and cocaine containing methyl (piperidin-3-yl)-methanoate. Cocaine is a local anesthetic and ligand channel blocker with SNDRI action, while methylphenidate is an NDRI with 2–3 fold selectivity for the dopamine transporter (DAT) over the norepinephrine transporter (NET). Cocaine is also more potent in serotonin transporters (SERTs) than in NDRI sites.

Four isomers of methylphenidate are possible, since the molecule has two chiral centers. One pair of threo isomers and one pair of erythro isomers are distinguished, from which primarily d-threo-methylphenidate exhibits the pharmacologically desired effects. The erythro diastereomers are pressor amines, a property not shared with the threo diastereomers. When the drug was first introduced, it was sold as a 4:1 mixture of erythro:threo diastereomers, but it was later reformulated to contain only the threo diastereomers. "TMP" refers to a threo product that does not contain any erythro diastereomers, i.e., (±)-threo-methylphenidate. Since the threo isomers are energetically favored, it is easy to epimerize out any of the undesired erythro isomers. The drug that contains only dextrorotatory methylphenidate is sometimes called d-TMP, although this name is only rarely used, and it is much more commonly referred to as dexmethylphenidate, d-MPH, or d-threo-methylphenidate. A review on the synthesis of enantiomerically pure (2R,2'R)-(+)-threo-methylphenidate hydrochloride has been published.

Methylphenidate synthesis

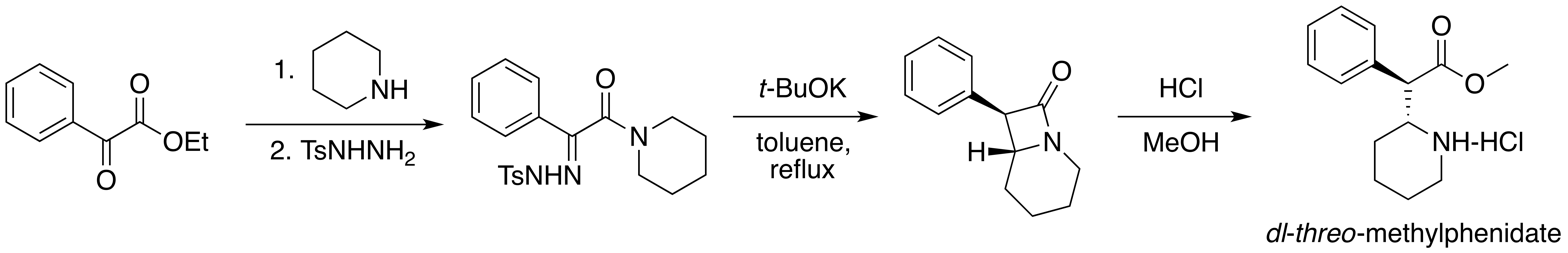
Method 1: Methylphenidate preparation elucidated by Axten et al. (1998) via Bamford–Stevens reaction.

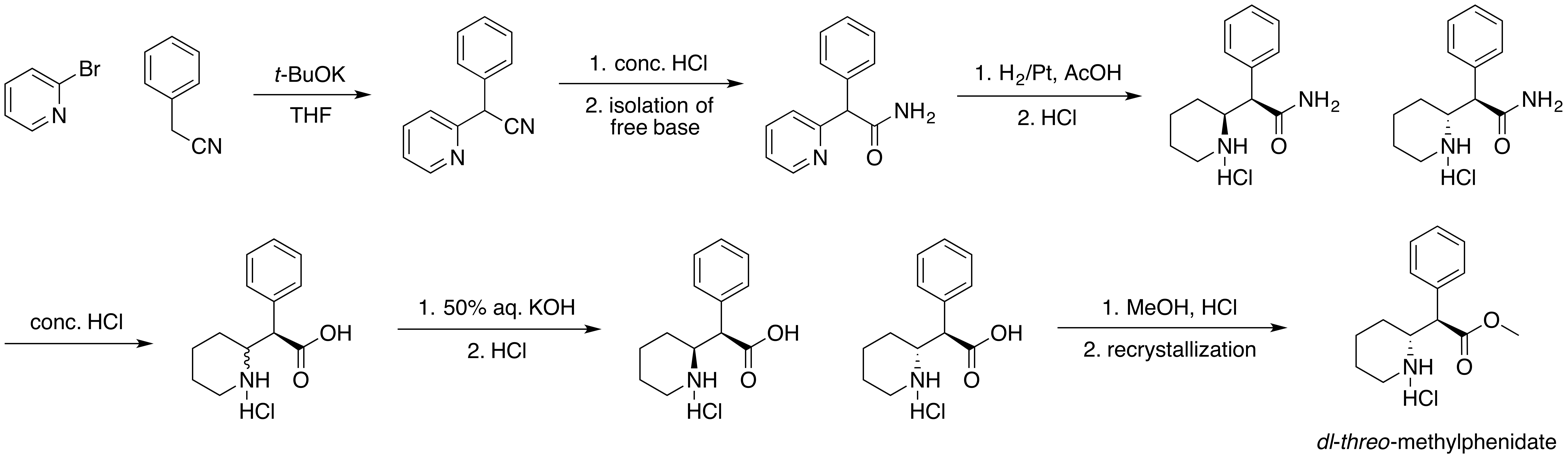
Method 2: Classic methylphenidate synthesis

=== Detection in biological fluids ===
The concentration of methylphenidate or ritalinic acid, its major metabolite, may be quantified in plasma, serum, or whole blood to monitor compliance in those receiving the drug therapeutically, to confirm the diagnosis of potential poisoning victims or to assist in the forensic investigation in a case of fatal overdose.

== History ==
Methylphenidate was first synthesized in 1944 and was approved for medical use in the United States in 1955. It was synthesized by chemist Leandro Panizzon and sold by Swiss company CIBA (now Novartis). He named the drug after his wife Marguerite, nicknamed Rita, who used Ritalin to compensate for low blood pressure. Methylphenidate was not reported to be a stimulant until 1954. The drug was introduced for medical use in the United States in 1957. Originally, it was marketed as a mixture of two racemates, 80% (±)-erythro and 20% (±)-threo, under the brand name Centedrin. Subsequent studies of the racemates showed that the central stimulant activity is associated with the threo racemate and were focused on the separation and interconversion of the erythro isomer into the more active threo isomer. The erythro isomer was eliminated, and now modern formulations of methylphenidate contain only the threo isomer in a 50:50 mixture of d- and l-isomers.

Methylphenidate was first used to allay barbiturate-induced coma, narcolepsy and depression. It was later used to treat memory deficits in the elderly. Beginning in the 1960s, it was used to treat children with attention deficit hyperactivity disorder (ADHD) based on earlier work, starting with the studies by American psychiatrist Charles Bradley on the use of psychostimulant drugs, such as Benzedrine, with so-called "maladjusted children". Production and prescription of methylphenidate rose significantly in the 1990s, especially in the United States, as the ADHD diagnosis came to be better understood and more generally accepted within the medical and mental health communities.

In 2000, Alza Corporation received FDA approval to market Concerta, a modified-release form of methylphenidate that uses the osmotic-controlled release oral delivery system.

It was estimated that the number of methylphenidate doses used globally in 2013 increased by 66% compared to 2012. In 2023, it was the 50th most commonly prescribed medication in the United States, with more than 13 million prescriptions. It is available as a generic medication.

== Society and culture ==
=== Names ===
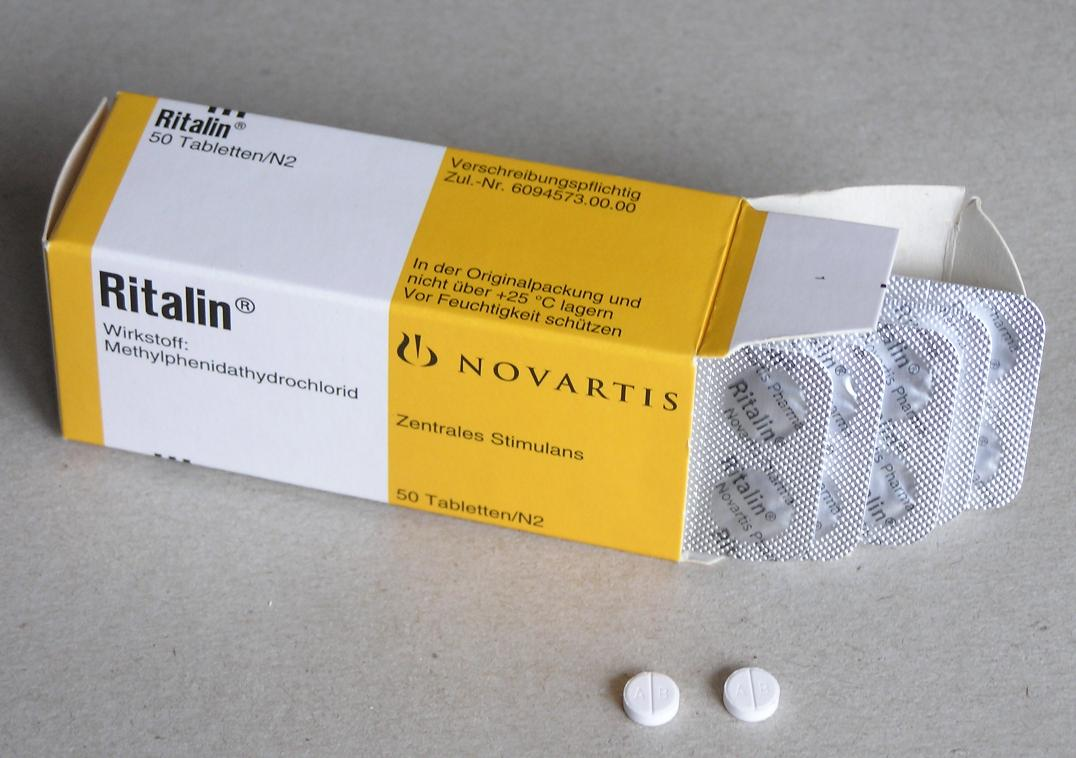
Swiss "Ritalin" brand methylphenidate

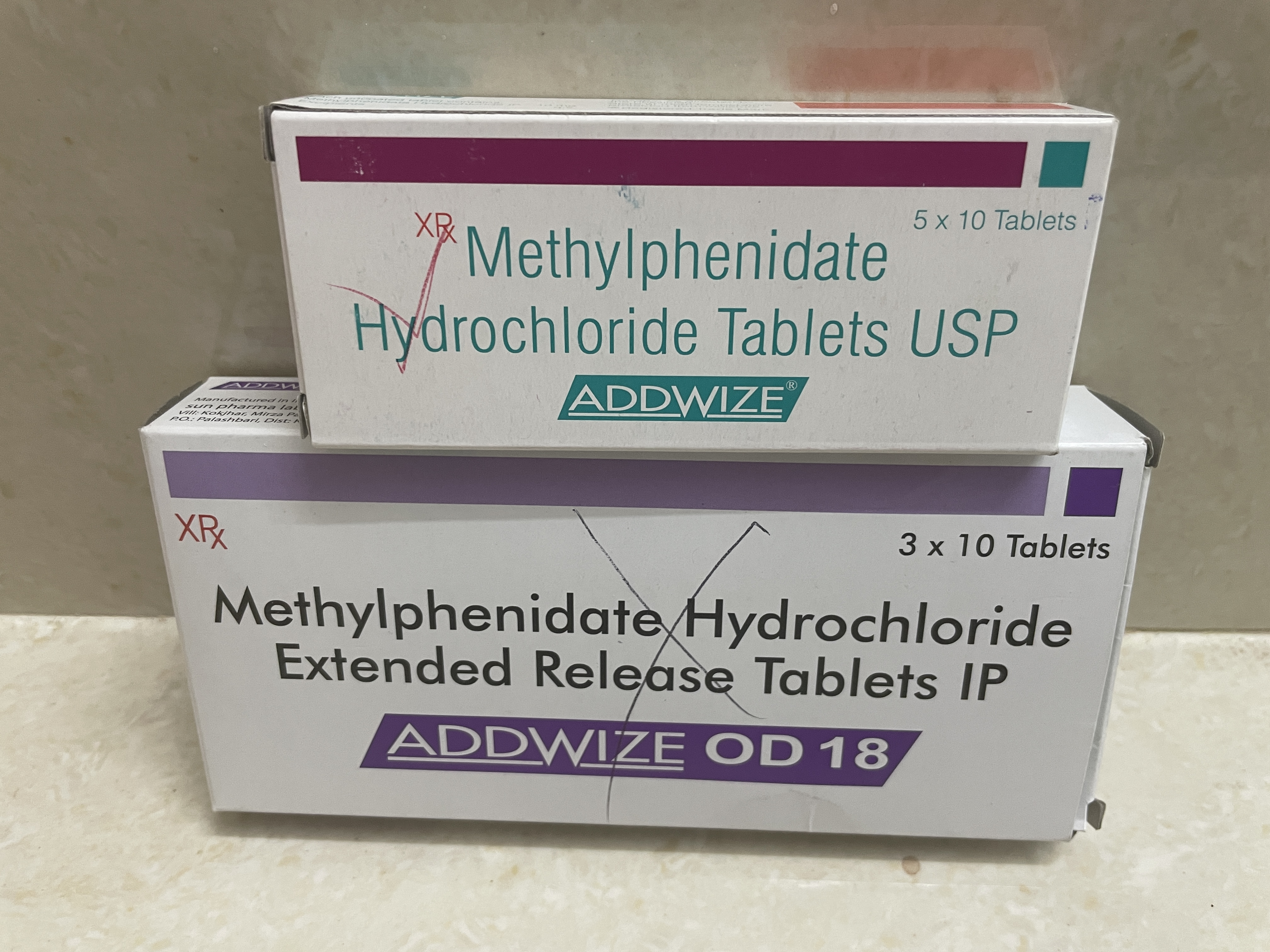
Indian "AddWize" branded immediate-release and extended-release formulations costing US$1.90 for a strip of immediate-release and US$2.90 for a strip of AddWize extended-release

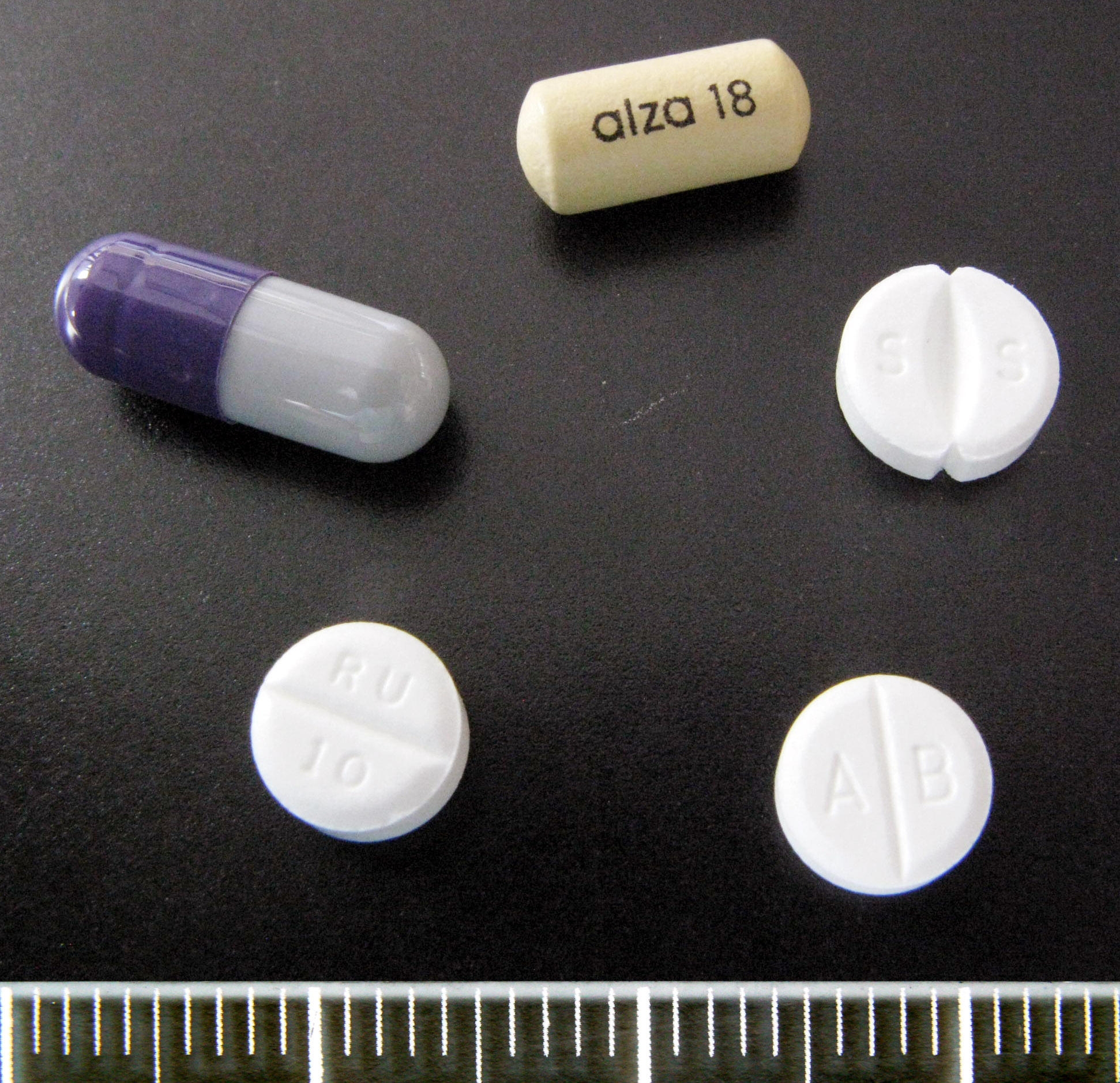
Clockwise from top: Concerta 18 mg, Medikinet 5 mg, Methylphenidate TAD 10 mg, Ritalin 10 mg, Medikinet XL 40 mg

Methylphenidate is sold in most countries worldwide. Brand names for methylphenidate include Ritalin (in honor of Rita, the wife of the molecule discoverer Leandro Panizzon), Rilatine (in Belgium to avoid a conflict with the commercial name of the RIT pharmaceutical company), Concerta, Medikinet, Adaphen, Addwize, Inspiral, Methmild, Artige, Attenta, Cognil, Konsenidat, Equasym, Foquest, Methylin, Penid, Phenida, Prohiper, and Tradea.

Modified-release methylphenidate products include:

Brand names	Generic names	Duration	Dosage form
Aptensio XR (US); Biphentin (CA)	Currently unavailable	12 hours	XR capsule
Concerta (US/CA/AU); Concerta XL (UK)	methylphenidate ER (US/CA); (Note: US generic manufactured by Actavis; CA generics manufactured by Pharmascience and Apotex.) methylphenidate ER‑C (CA) (Note: Manufactured by Teva.)	12 hours	OROS tablet
Quillivant XR (US)	Currently unavailable	12 hours	oral suspension
Daytrana (US)	methylphenidate film, extended release;transdermal (US) (Note: Manufactured by Mylan Tech Viatris)	11 hours	transdermal patch
Metadate CD (US); Equasym XL (UK)	methylphenidate ER (US) (Note: Manufactured by Impax, Mallinckrodt, and Teva.)	8–10 hours	CD/XL capsule
QuilliChew ER (US)	Currently unavailable	8 hours	chewable tablet
Jornay PM (US)	Currently unavailable	6 hours (following 10 hour delay)	DR/ER capsule
Ritalin LA (US/AU); Medikinet XL (UK)	methylphenidate ER (US) (Note: Manufactured by Barr and Mayne.)	8 hours	ER capsule
Tuzulby (EU)		8 hours	chewable tablet
Ritalin SR (US/CA/UK); Rubifen SR (NZ)	Metadate ER (US); (Note: Manufactured by UCB.); Methylin ER (US); (Note: Manufactured by Mallinckrodt.) methylphenidate SR (US/CA) (Note: US generics manufactured by County Line Pharmaceuticals and Abhai; CA generic manufactured by Apotex.)	5–8 hours	CR tablet

Concerta tablets are marked with the letters "ALZA" and followed by "18", "27", "36", or "54", relating to the dosage strength in milligrams. They use osmotic-controlled release oral delivery system. Approximately 22% of the dose is immediate-release, and the remaining 78% of the dose is released over 10–12 hours post-ingestion, with an initial increase over the first 6–7 hours, and subsequent decline in the released drug.

Ritalin LA capsules are marked with the letters "NVR" (abbrev.: Novartis) and followed by "R20", "R30", or "R40", depending on the (mg) dosage strength. Ritalin LA provides two standard doses – half the total dose being released immediately and the other half released four hours later. In total, each capsule is effective for about eight hours.

Metadate CD capsules contain two types of beads: 30% are immediate-release, and the other 70% are evenly sustained-release.

Medikinet Retard/CR/Adult/Modified Release tablets are an extended-release oral capsule form of methylphenidate. It delivers 50% of the dosage as IR MPH and the remaining 50% in 3–4 hours.

Jornay PM is a delayed-release formulation that is taken at bedtime. An outer polymer coating delays the initial release of the drug until 8 hours after administration, after which an inner coating regulates the rate of drug absorption. Peak plasma concentration occurs 14 hours following administration. This formulation was motivated by the need for a pediatric ADHD medication that is active immediately after morning waking, as most long-acting formulations exhibit a delay between administration and absorption that leads to inadequate therapeutic effect in the early morning.

=== Cost ===
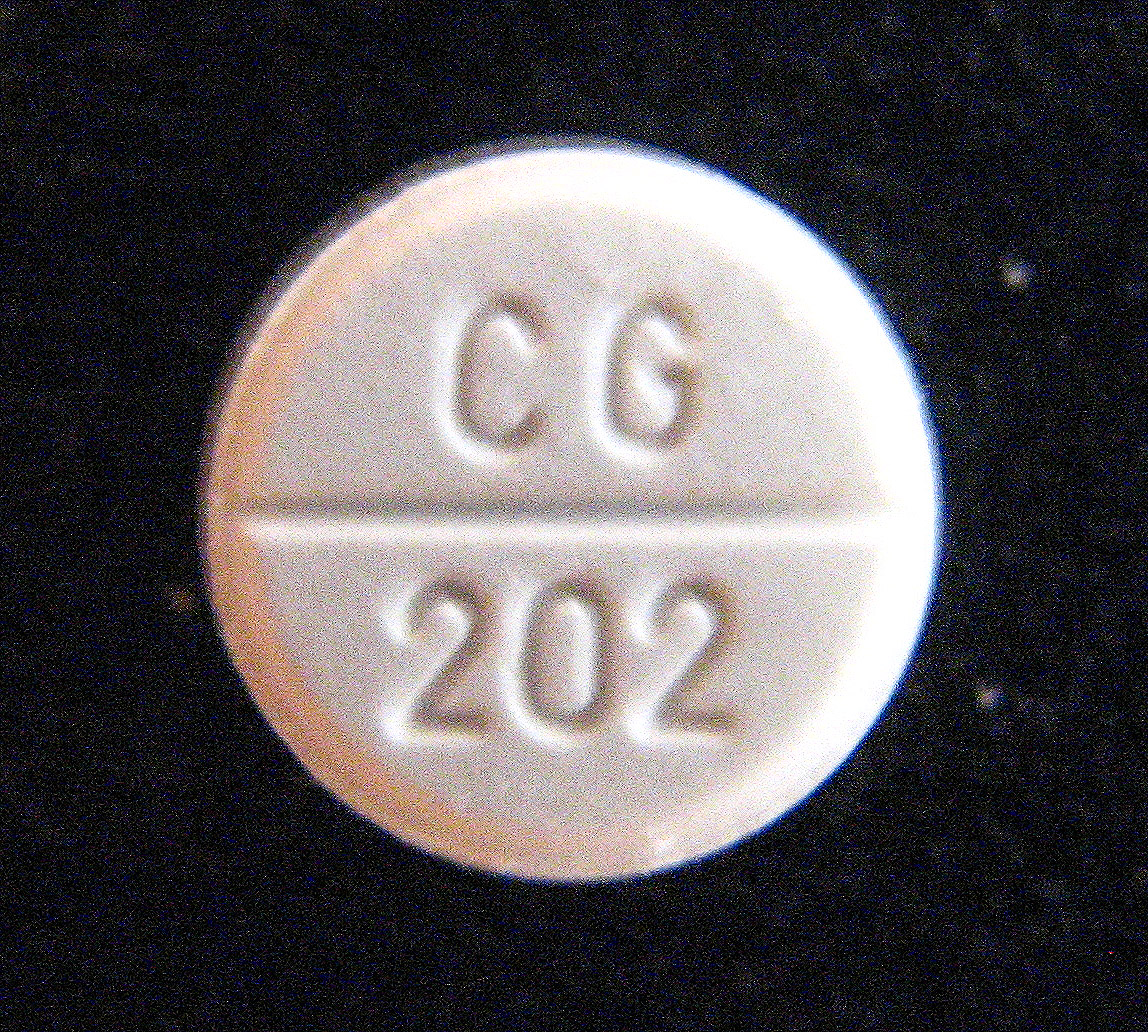
Ritalin 10 mg tablet

Brand-name and generic formulations are available.

=== Legal status ===
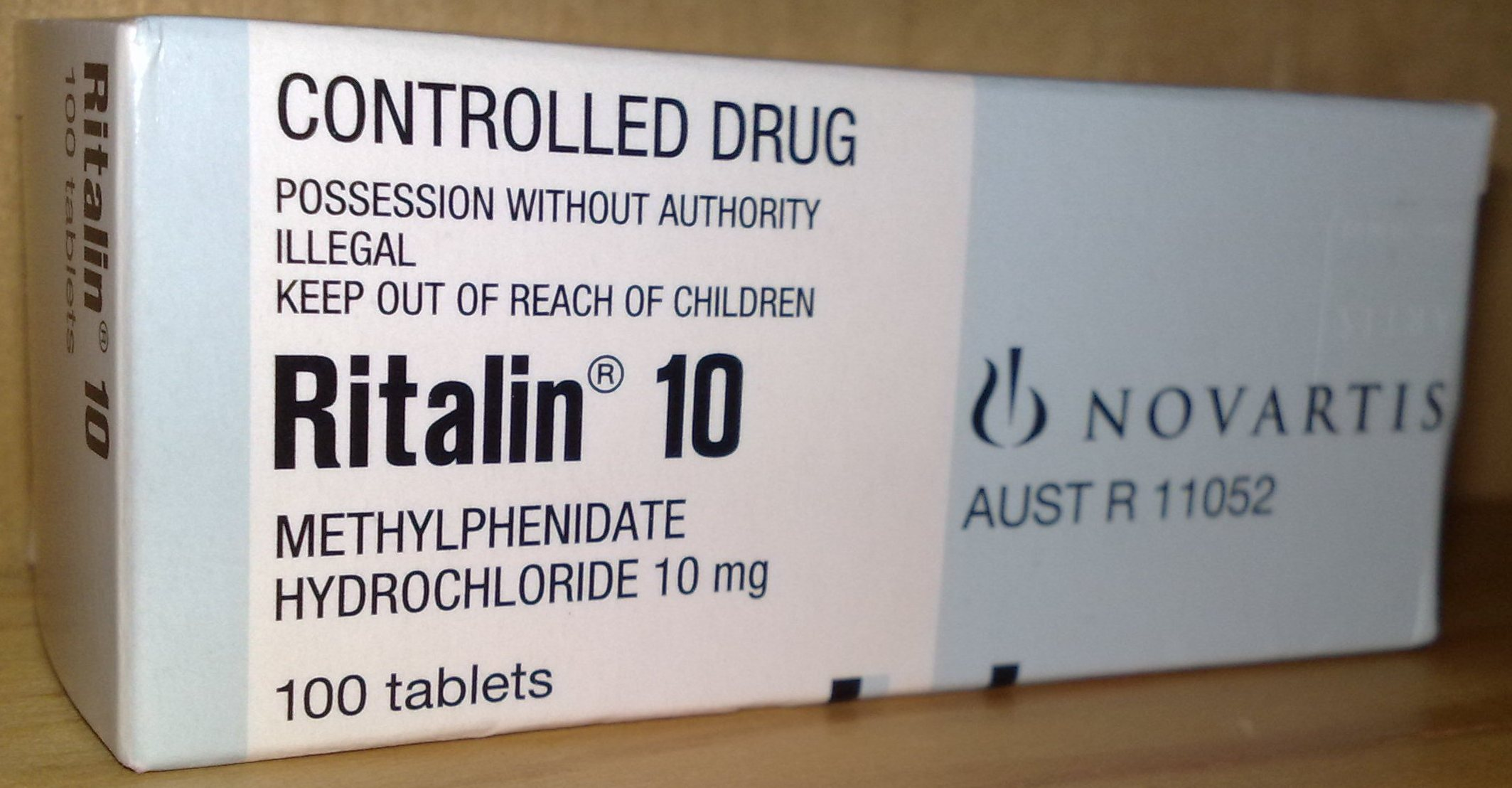
Legal warning printed on Ritalin packaging

Internationally, methylphenidate is a Schedule II drug under the Convention on Psychotropic Substances. Its legal status varies by jurisdiction.

Legal	Controlled substance	Illegal

Country/ Territory	Status	Notes
Australia	"Schedule 8" controlled substance. Such drugs must be kept in a lockable safe until dispensed, and possession without a prescription is punishable by fines and imprisonment.	
Canada	Schedule III of the Controlled Drugs and Substances Act and is illegal to possess without a prescription, with unlawful possession punishable by up to three years imprisonment, or (via summary conviction) by up to one-year imprisonment and/or fines of up to two thousand dollars. Unlawful possession for trafficking is punishable by up to ten years imprisonment, or (via summary conviction) by up to eighteen months imprisonment.	
China	Classified as a Class I psychotropic substance (Chinese: 第一类精神药品）	
Fiji	Schedule 1 Illicit Drug under the Illicit Drugs Control Act 2004	
France	Covered by the "narcotics" schedule, prescription and distribution conditions are restricted, with hospital or city specialist-only (pediatrician for children, psychiatrist or neurologist for adults) prescription for the initial treatment and yearly consultations.	
Germany	Classified as Anlage III	
Hong Kong	Controlled under the schedule 1 of the Dangerous Drugs Ordinance (cap. 134).	
India	Methylphenidate is a schedule X drug and is controlled by the Drugs and Cosmetics Rules, 1945. It is dispensed only by a physician's prescription. Legally, 2 grams of methylphenidate is classified as a small quantity, and 50 grams as a large or commercial quantity.	
New Zealand	In New Zealand, methylphenidate is a "Class B2 controlled substance". Unlawful possession is punishable by a 6-month prison sentence and distribution by a 14-year sentence.	
Russia	List I controlled psychotropic substance without recognized medical value. The Constant Committee for Drug Control of the Russian Ministry of Health has put methylphenidate and its derivatives on the National List of Narcotics, Psychotropic Substances and Their Precursors, and the Government banned methylphenidate for any use on 25 October 2014.	
Sweden	List II controlled substance with recognized medical value. Possession without a prescription is punishable by up to three years in prison.	
United Kingdom	Controlled "Class B" substance. Possession without prescription carries a sentence of up to 5 years or an unlimited fine, or both; supplying methylphenidate is 14 years or an unlimited fine, or both.	
United States	Classified as a Schedule II controlled substance	

=== Controversy ===
Methylphenidate has been the subject of controversy in relation to its use in the treatment of ADHD. The prescription of psychostimulant medication to children to reduce ADHD symptoms has been a major point of criticism. The contention that methylphenidate acts as a gateway drug has been discredited by multiple sources, according to which abuse is statistically very low and "stimulant therapy in childhood does not increase the risk for subsequent drug and alcohol abuse disorders later in life". A study found that ADHD medication was not associated with an increased risk of cigarette use, and in fact, stimulant treatments such as Ritalin seemed to lower this risk. People treated with stimulants such as methylphenidate during childhood were less likely to have substance use disorders in adulthood.

Among countries with the highest rates of use of methylphenidate medication is Iceland, where research shows that the drug was the most commonly used substance among people who inject drugs. The study involved 108 people who inject drugs and 88% of them had injected methylphenidate within the last 30 days. For 63% of them, methylphenidate was the most preferred substance.

Treatment of ADHD by way of methylphenidate has led to legal actions, including malpractice suits regarding informed consent, inadequate information on side effects, misdiagnosis, and coercive use of medications by school systems.

== Etymology ==
The word methylphenidate is a portmanteau of the chemical name, Methyl-2-phenyl-2-(piperidin-2-yl) acetate.

The name Ritalin derives from Marguerite "Rita" Panizzon, the wife of Leandro Panizzon, who first synthesized the drug in 1944. Rita was the first person to take methylphenidate and described its effects to her husband.

== Research ==
=== Apathy ===
Methylphenidate may be effective as a treatment for apathy in Alzheimer's disease and other conditions. It may also be useful in the treatment of more severe disorders of diminished motivation, like abulia and akinetic mutism.

=== Schizophrenia ===
Methylphenidate has been shown to reduce rates of hospitalization in patients with schizophrenia, although repeated, elevated doses can provoke psychosis.

=== Addiction ===
Methylphenidate has shown some benefits as a replacement therapy for individuals who are addicted to and dependent upon methamphetamine. Methylphenidate and amphetamine have been investigated as a chemical replacement for the treatment of cocaine addiction. Its effectiveness in treatment of cocaine or psychostimulant addiction or psychological dependence has not been proven.

=== Social anxiety ===
Methylphenidate has been reported to be effective in the treatment of social anxiety disorder in people who are comorbid for both this condition and attention deficit hyperactivity disorder (ADHD) in small preliminary clinical studies and case reports.
