= Royal LePage =

Canadian real estate franchiser

- Formerly: A.E. LePage (1913-1984)
- Type: Subsidiary
- Industry: Real estate
- Founded: Toronto, Ontario, Canada (July 2, 1913)
- Founder: Albert E. LePage
- Headquarters: North York, Ontario, Canada
- Key people: Phil Soper (President, CEO), Spencer Enright (Chairman)
- Products: Real estate brokerage services
- Number of employees: 20000+
- Parent: Brookfield Asset Management
- Website: www.royallepage.ca

Royal LePage is a Canadian real estate franchiser and owner-operator with more than 670 locations and over 20,000 realtors in Canada. The company was founded on July 2, 1913, in Toronto, Canada by then 26-year-old Albert Edward (A.E.) LePage, under the name "A.E. LePage, Bungalow Specialist." In 1984, the company was renamed Royal LePage Real Estate Services following a merger with Royal Trust's real estate brokerage business.

Today, the company is led by Phil Soper, who was named president of Royal LePage in 2002 and chief executive officer in 2004. Royal LePage is a Bridgemarq Real Estate Services company, a TSX-listed corporation trading under the symbol TSX:BRE.

== History ==
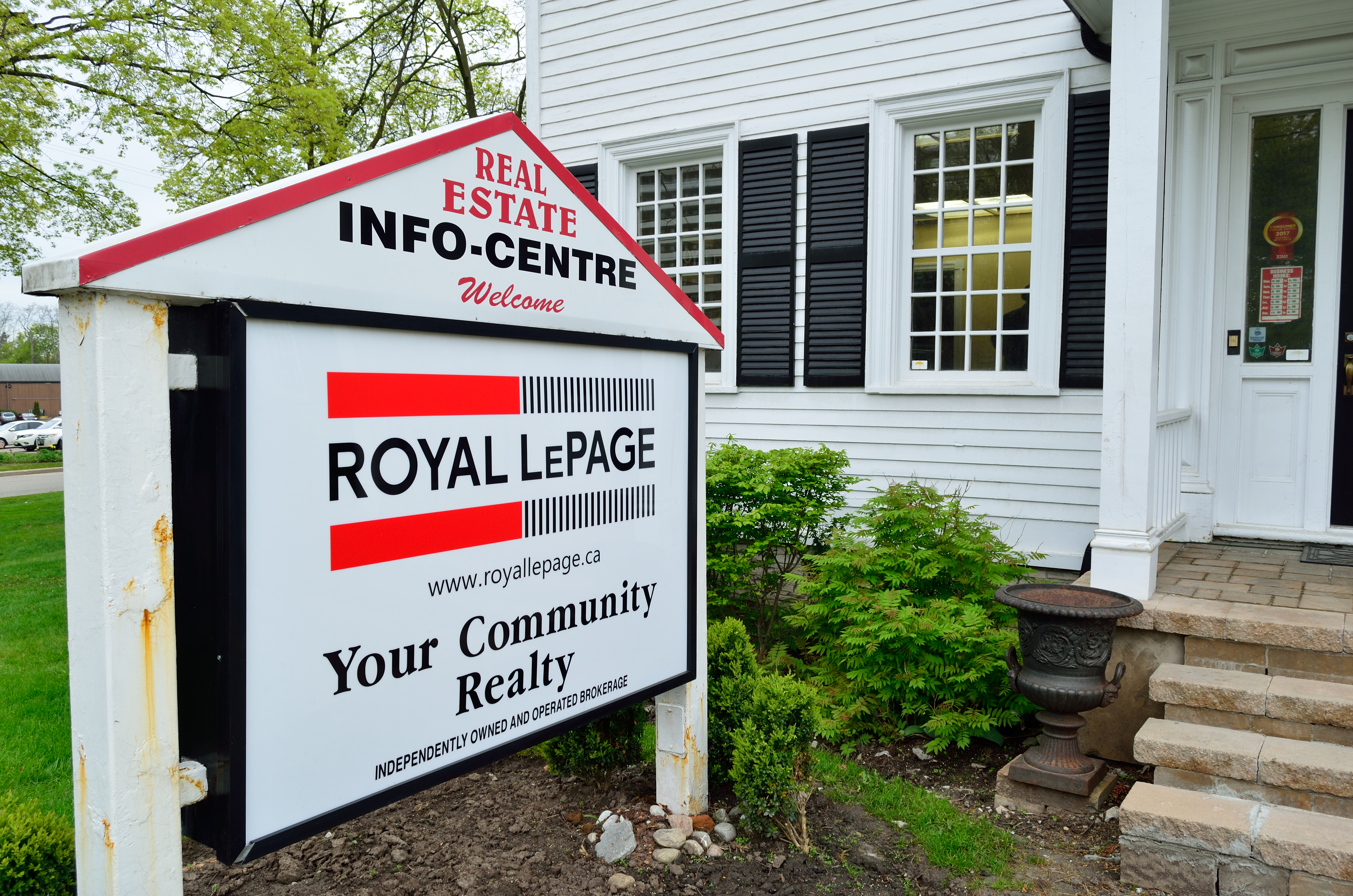
Royal LePage

Albert Edward (A.E.) LePage established his real estate company ‘A.E. LePage – The Bungalow Specialist’ on July 2, 1913.

In 1920, A.E. LePage assisted in founding the Toronto Real Estate Board with an eye towards establishing codes of ethical practice for the industry.

Following A.E. LePage's retirement in 1953, the company, under new ownership, assembled 800 hectares of farmland, creating North America's first planned development in the town of Don Mills, Ontario.

In 1960, the A.E. LePage company played a pivotal role in the land assembly and office leasing of the Toronto-Dominion Centre, the largest project of its time within the British Commonwealth.

In 1964, the company offered a new service to help companies across Canada with employee relocations. The service now operates as BGRS.

In 1970, A.E. LePage rapidly expanded its residential business through more than 140 acquisitions across Canada.

In 1974, The Survey of Canadian House Prices, later known as the Royal LePage House Price Survey, was launched.

A.E. LePage and Royal Trust merged in 1984, creating the country's leading diversified real estate services organization. The new company was named Royal LePage Real Estate Services.

Royal LePage became a publicly traded company in 1987, trading on the Toronto, Vancouver and Montreal stock exchanges.

In 1994, Royal LePage began offering a franchise system.

Royal LePage launched www.royallepage.ca in 1995, Canada's first national real estate portal.

In 1998, the Royal LePage Shelter Foundation was launched, creating the only Canadian real estate company with its own charitable foundation.

The Royal LePage Franchise Services Fund was listed on the Toronto Stock Exchange (TSX) in 2003. That year, Royal LePage acquired Le Groupe Trans-Action.

Royal LePage re-launched its commercial division in April 2012, as Royal LePage Commercial, and added www.royallepagecommercial.com to its online websites.
