= Ontario Real Estate Association =

Canadian provincial real estate association

- Abbreviation: OREA
- Founded: 1922; 104 years ago
- Type: Professional association
- Headquarters: Toronto, Ontario, Canada
- Region served: Ontario, Canada
- Field: Real estate
- Interim CEO: Cathy Polan
- Affiliations: Canadian Real Estate Association
- Website: orea.com
- Formerly called: Ontario Association of Real Estate Boards

The Ontario Real Estate Association (OREA) is a professional association that represents real estate brokers and salespeople who are members of Ontario's real estate boards. It has its headquarters at 15 Kern Road in Toronto, Ontario.

== History ==
The Ontario Association of Real Estate Boards (later renamed the Ontario Real Estate Association) was founded in 1922 to organize real estate activities on a province-wide basis. In 1930, the Ontario government brought into law the Real Estate and Business Brokers Act. The government of Ontario codified and regulated the real estate broker occupation. A new law was enacted, under the supervision of the Ontario Securities Commission, called an Act for Registration of Real Estate Brokers and Salesmen. Bill 150 was introduced into the Legislature on March 21, 1930, by Mr. Ferguson, and royal assent was given on April 30, 1930.

The act was amended in 1940 and again in 1949, but there were still no academic qualifications required, and no formal training in the real estate business was required. The Ontario Association started an educational program in four different locations in the province in 1954. Finally, in 1959, individuals had to pass a short examination on their knowledge of the Real Estate and Business Brokers Act.

By 1975, the Ontario Association was successful in convincing the Ministry of Consumer and Commercial Relations in Ontario (which by that time was responsible for supervising the Real Estate and Business Brokers Act) that mandatory education, for registration of all registrants in the province, be elevated to 150 hours of study, with an examination that had to be passed with a 75 per cent pass mark. There were also new Broker courses introduced, along with a new certificate program, which had to be passed with the same 75 per cent mark, to qualify for registration as a Broker.

An articling program was launched in 1988, which required all new registrants to complete and pass three more forty-hour courses within their first two years of registration. If they failed to do that, they would not have their registrations renewed until these requirements were satisfied.

The Ontario Real Estate Association and the provincial government signed an agreement in 1997, which granted the right to self-management. The Real Estate Council of Ontario was established in 1997 to administer the Real Estate and Business Brokers Act on behalf of the provincial government. In October 2005, OREA avoided being regulated by the Law Society of Upper Canada.

=== Timeline ===
- 1918 - The Windsor Essex County Real Estate Board, the oldest real estate board in Ontario, was incorporated on April 12, 1918, with 25 member brokers; it was initially called The Border Cities Real Estate Board.
- 1920 - Toronto Real Estate Board was founded; it is Canada's largest real estate board.
- 1997 - Real Estate Council of Ontario was founded to administer the Real Estate and Business Brokers Act (REBBA).
- 2002 - OREA Real Estate College was formed, assuming all of the duties of the OREA Education Department.

== Leadership ==
On August 9, 2016, Tim Hudak was appointed as Chief Executive Officer of OREA by its board of directors, effective December 2, 2016. Hudak was formerly a Progressive Conservative Party of Ontario MPP in the Legislative Assembly of Ontario for 21 years (from 1995 to 2016), as well as the party's leader from 2009 to 2014. He served as Minister of Consumer and Business Services from 2002 to 2003, and he previously had several other positions in the provincial cabinet.

The current president of OREA's board of directors is Ettore Cardarelli, who assumed that role in March 2017.

== Work ==
OREA provides real estate registration courses in Ontario through the OREA Real Estate College.

== See also ==
- Canadian Real Estate Association
- Ottawa Real Estate Board
- Multiple Listing Service
- Real Estate Council of Ontario
- Real Estate and Business Brokers Act
