= New Brunswick Real Estate Association =

The New Brunswick Real Estate Association is a Canadian provincial association for those who work in the real estate industry. Founded in 1958, it serves and regulates its members through education in professional and ethical standards and promotion of public awareness for the benefit of realtors and the public they serve.

One of the roles of the NBREA is to co-regulate the practice of trading in real estate within the province in conjunction with the provincial government. The Association is committed to protecting the interests of New Brunswick's real estate buyers and sellers by:

- Developing and maintaining standards of qualification for real estate agents, managers, and salespersons.
- Providing educational programs for its members, including pre-licensing courses and continuing education.
- Promoting public awareness of the role of the Association.
- Enforcing strict adherence to standards of professional ethics as specified in the CREA Realtor Code of Ethics.

The NBREA consists of 5 local real estate boards:

- Northern New Brunswick Real Estate Board (c/o: Saint John)
- Saint John Real Estate Board
- Greater Moncton Real Estate Board
- Real Estate Board Of Fredericton Area
- Valley Real Estate Board (c/o: Saint John)

== Real Estate in New Brunswick ==
The practice of real estate in New Brunswick is governed by two separate Acts. An Act to Incorporate the New Brunswick Real Estate Association, promulgated in 1994 and administered by NBREA, is a private member's bill that establishes the Association and describes how it will conduct its business. The Real Estate Agents Act is a government act that allows for the licensing of real estate firms (agents), managers (who are called “brokers” in other provinces), and salespeople (who may be referred to as “agents” in other provinces).
