= Toronto Regional Real Estate Board =

Professional organisation in Canada

The Toronto Regional Real Estate Board (TRREB), formerly the Toronto Real Estate Board (TREB), is a non-profit professional association of registered real estate brokers and salespeople in and about the Greater Toronto Area. TRREB's Toronto office is located at 1400 Don Mills Road.

TRREB was formed in 1920, and 100 years after its formation, in January 2020, the name was changed from Toronto Real Estate Board.

== Multiple Listing Service ==
Toronto's Co-operative Listing System was first created in 1924, but only lasted 8 months. Later, in 1944, its Multiple Listing Service was established, and was computerized in 1974.

TRREB currently utilizes REALM by Stratus Data Systems and Matrix by CoreLogic to allow members to manage their listings.

In April 2021, TRREB announced it would stop using the word "master" when referencing main bedrooms in homes, because the word "is often seen as a reference to racism, sexism and slavery".

== Members ==
TRREB currently has over 73,000 Realtor members, the most of any real estate association in Canada.

Members of TRREB are licensed by the Real Estate Council of Ontario (RECO) to trade in real estate in Ontario.

Members and member offices can be found by using the search function on the home page of its website. All members of the Board are also members of the Ontario Real Estate Association and Canadian Real Estate Association, and as such, are permitted to use the term REALTOR. The REALTOR and MLS trademarks are owned by the Canadian Real Estate Association (CREA).

== See also ==
- Canadian Real Estate Association
- Ontario Real Estate Association
