= Newfoundland & Labrador Association of Realtors =

Canadian realtor organization

Formed in 2005, the Newfoundland and Labrador Association of Realtors (NLAR) represents licensed real estate brokers and salespeople in Newfoundland and Labrador.

NLAR was formed in 2005 by the amalgamation of the Newfoundland Real Estate Association and three local real estate boards:

- Central Newfoundland Real Estate Board
- Humber Valley Real Estate Board (disbanded 2004)
- St. John's Real Estate Board

== See also ==
- Canadian Real Estate Association
- Multiple Listing Service
