= Manitoba Real Estate Association =

- Founded: 1949
- Headquarters: 1873 Inkster Blvd, Winnipeg, MB R2R 2A6
- Area served: Manitoba, Canada
- Key people: Stewart Elston, president; Julie Friesen, president elect; David Salvatore, CEO
- Members: 2100+ (2021)
- Website: realestatemanitoba.com

The Manitoba Real Estate Association (MREA) a trade association that represents real estate brokers, agents, and salespeople in Manitoba, Canada. Its membership includes more than 2100 individuals (as of 2021), who work through one of Manitoba's four real estate boards:

- Winnipeg Real Estate Board (WRREB) — in and around the Winnipeg Metro Region; founded in 1903, making it one of the longest-running real estate boards in Canada
- Brandon Area REALTORS (formerly Brandon Real Estate Board) — in and around the Brandon area
- Portage la Prairie Real Estate Board — in Portage la Prairie
- Thompson Real Estate Board — in Thompson

== See also ==
- Canadian Real Estate Association
- National Association of Realtors (USA)
- Multiple Listing Service
