= Osmotic-controlled release oral delivery system =

Advanced controlled release oral drug delivery system

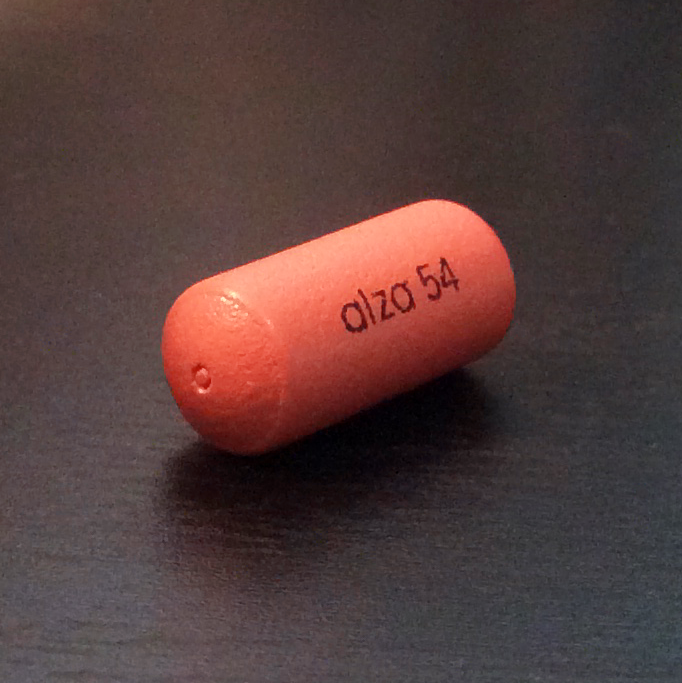
A 54 mg tablet of Concerta, which uses OROS technology. 22% of the drug is contained in the red overcoat, while the remaining 78% is split between two drug layers of differing concentration. The tablet uses an additional push layer that expands as water enters the tablet via the osmotic membrane. The drug is expelled via the laser-drilled hole visible on the left side of the tablet.

The osmotic-controlled release oral delivery system (OROS) is an advanced controlled release oral drug delivery system in the form of a rigid tablet with a semi-permeable outer membrane and one or more small laser drilled holes in it. As the tablet passes through the body, water is absorbed through the semipermeable membrane via osmosis, and the resulting osmotic pressure is used to push the active drug through the laser drilled opening(s) in the tablet and into the gastrointestinal tract. OROS is a trademarked name owned by ALZA Corporation, which pioneered the use of osmotic pumps for oral drug delivery.

== Rationale ==
=== Pros and cons ===
Osmotic release systems have a number of major advantages over other controlled-release mechanisms. They are significantly less affected by factors such as pH, food intake, GI motility, and differing intestinal environments. Using an osmotic pump to deliver drugs has additional inherent advantages regarding control over drug delivery rates. This allows for much more precise drug delivery over an extended period of time, which results in much more predictable pharmacokinetics. However, osmotic release systems are relatively complicated, somewhat difficult to manufacture, and may cause irritation or even blockage of the GI tract due to prolonged release of irritating drugs from the non-deformable tablet.

== Oral osmotic release systems ==
=== Single-layer ===
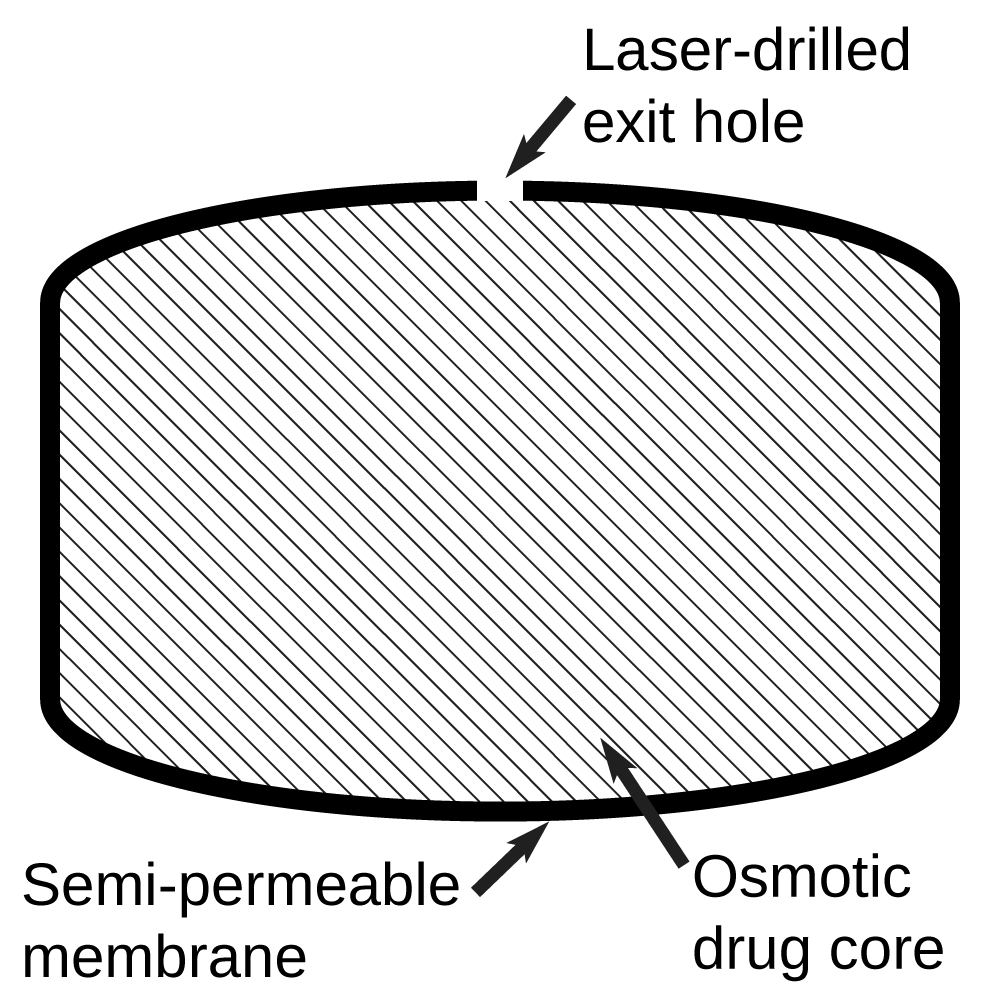
An illustration of the different components of the Elementary Osmotic Pump.

The Elementary Osmotic Pump (EOP) was developed by ALZA in 1974, and was the first practical example of an osmotic pump based drug release system for oral use. It was introduced to the market in the early 1980s in Osmosin (indomethacin) and Acutrim (phenylpropanolamine), but unexpectedly severe issues with GI irritation and cases of GI perforation led to the withdrawal of Osmosin.

Merck & Co. later developed the Controlled-Porosity Osmotic Pump (CPOP) with the intention of addressing some of the issues that led to Osmosin's withdrawal via a new approach to the final stage of the release mechanism. Unlike the EOP, the CPOP had no pre-formed hole in the outer shell for the drug to be expelled out of. Instead, the CPOP's semipermeable membrane was designed to form numerous small pores upon contact with water through which the drug would be expelled via osmotic pressure. The pores were formed via the use of a pH insensitive leachable or dissolvable additive such as sorbitol.

=== Multi-layer ===
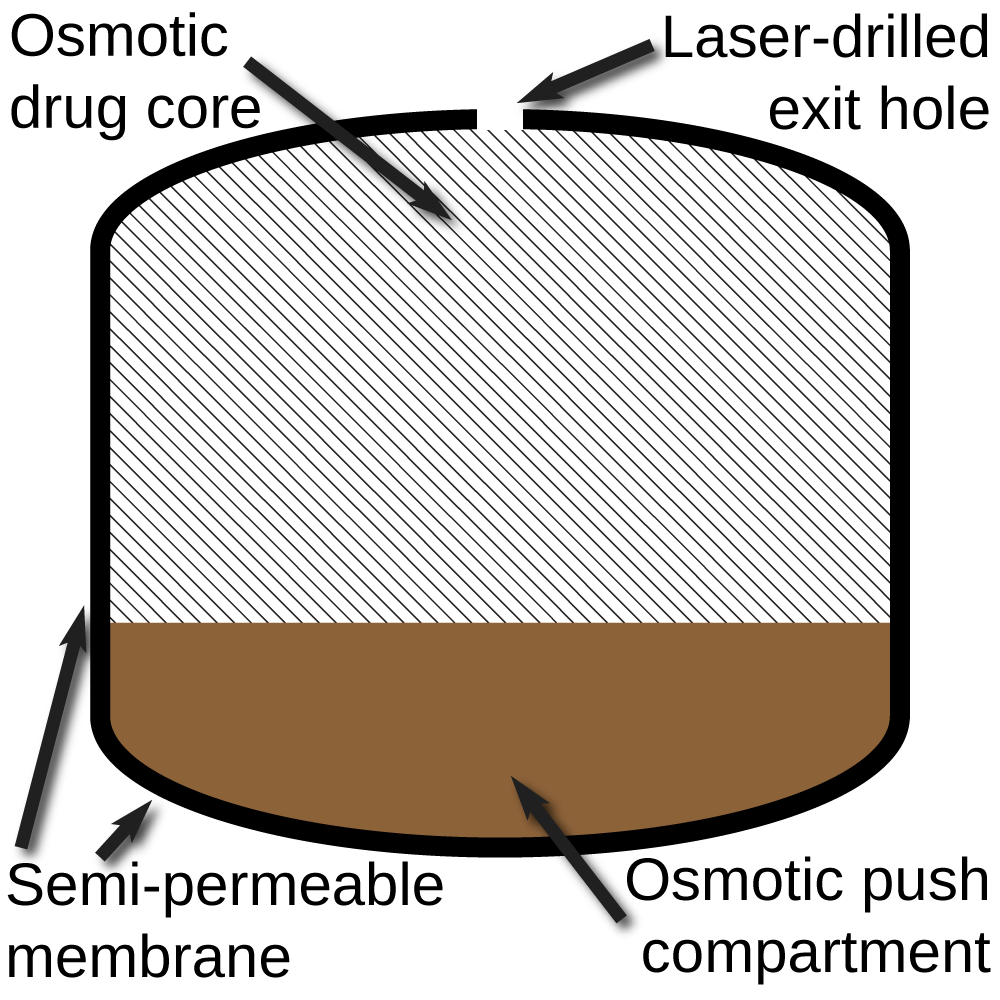
An illustration of the different components of the Push-Pull Osmotic Pump.

Both the EOP and CPOP were relatively simple designs, and were limited by their inability to deliver poorly soluble drugs. This led to the development of an additional internal "push layer" composed of material (a swellable polymer) that would expand as it absorbed water, which then pushed the drug layer (which incorporates a viscous polymer for suspension of poorly soluble drugs) out of the exit hole at a controlled rate. Osmotic agents such as sodium chloride, potassium chloride, or xylitol are added to both the drug and push layers to increase the osmotic pressure. The initial design developed in 1982 by ALZA researchers was designated the Push-Pull Osmotic Pump (PPOP), and Procardia XL (nifedipine) was one of the first drugs to utilize this PPOP design.

An animation illustrating the exterior/interior compositions of a tablet of Concerta, a PSOP OROS design.

In the early 1990s, an ALZA-funded research program began to develop a new dosage form of methylphenidate for the treatment of children with attention deficit hyperactivity disorder (ADHD). Methylphenidate's short half-life required multiple doses to be administered each day to attain long-lasting coverage, which made it an ideal candidate for the OROS technology. Multiple candidate pharmacokinetic profiles were evaluated and tested in an attempt to determine the optimal way to deliver the drug, which was especially important given the puzzling failure of an existing extended-release formulation of methylphenidate (Ritalin SR) to act as expected. The zero-order (flat) release profile that the PPOP was optimal at delivering failed to maintain its efficacy over time, which suggested that acute tolerance to methylphenidate formed over the course of the day. This explained why Ritalin SR was inferior to twice-daily Ritalin IR, and led to the hypothesis that an ascending pattern of drug delivery was necessary to maintain clinical effect. Trials designed to test this hypothesis were successful, and ALZA subsequently developed a modified PPOP design that utilized an overcoat of methylphenidate designed to release immediately and rapidly raise serum levels, followed by 10 hours of first-order (ascending) drug delivery from the modified PPOP design. This design was called the Push-Stick Osmotic Pump (PSOP), and utilized two separate drug layers with different concentrations of methylphenidate in addition to the (now quite robust) push layer.

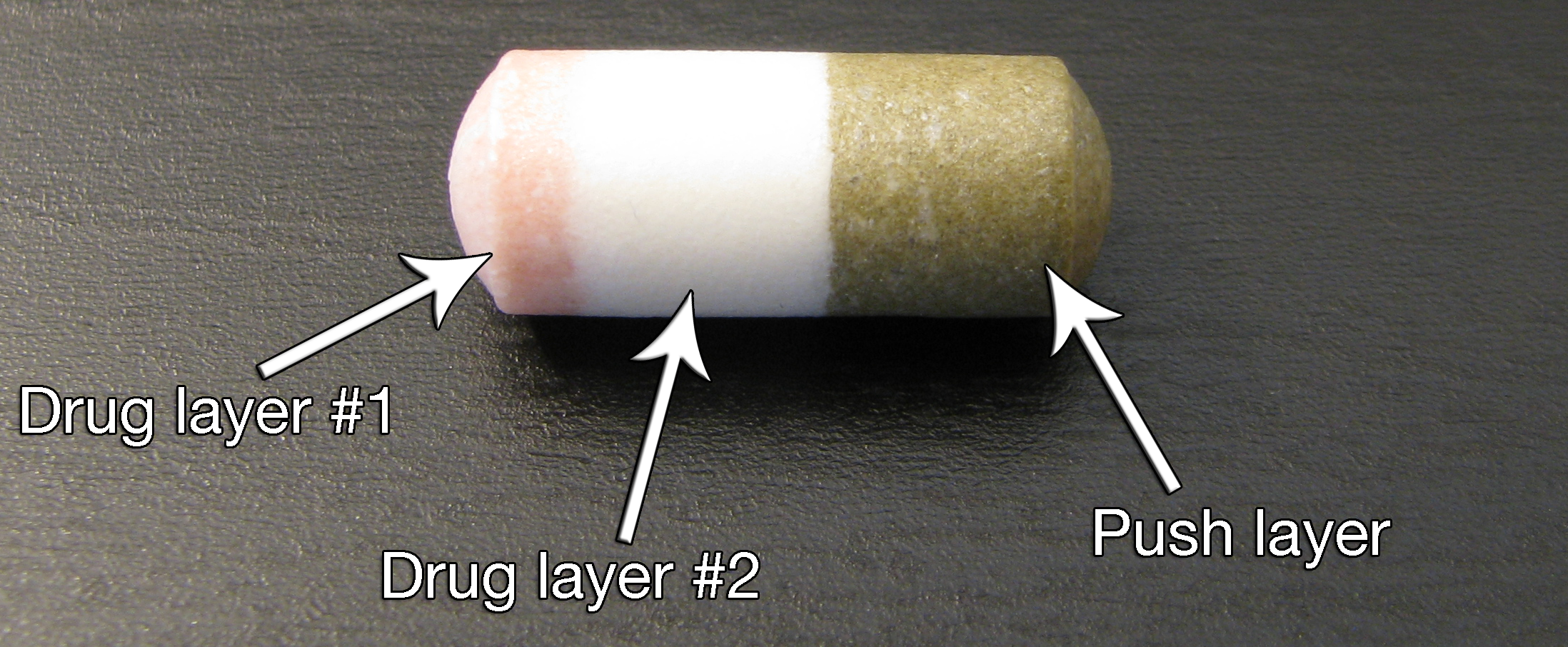
An illustration of the different inner components of a tablet of Concerta, a PSOP OROS design.

== List of OROS medications ==
OROS medications include:

- Acutrim (phenylpropanolamine)
- Adalat OROS (nifedipine)
- Alpress LP (prazosin)
- Cardura XL (doxazosin)
- Concerta (methylphenidate)
- Covera HS (verapamil)
- Ditropan XL/Lyrinel XL (oxybutynin)
- Dynacirc CR (isradipine)
- Efidac 24 (pseudoephedrine/brompheniramine, pseudoephedrine/chlorpheniramine, pseudoephedrine)
- Exalgo/Jurnista (hydromorphone)
- Glucotrol XL (glipizide)
- Invega (paliperidone)
- Minipress XL (prazosin)
- Procardia XL (nifedipine)
- Sudafed 24 (pseudoephedrine)
- Tegretol XR (carbamazepine)
- Volmax (salbutamol)
