= Mortgage Brokerages, Lenders and Administrators Act =

Ontario, Canada statute

The Mortgage Brokerages, Lenders and Administrators Act, 2006 (French: Loi de 2006 sur les maisons de courtage d’hypothèques, les prêteurs hypothécaires et les administrateurs d’hypothèques) (the Act) came into force on July 1, 2008, replacing Ontario's Mortgage Brokers Act, 1990, and requires all individuals and businesses who conduct mortgage brokering activities in Ontario to be licensed. The Act is currently administered by the Financial Services Regulatory Authority of Ontario.

Notable changes with the new legislation include:

- restrict the use of the titles, "mortgage brokerage", "mortgage broker", "mortgage agent", and "mortgage administrator" (and their French equivalents)
- application to real estate brokers who act as mortgage brokers in Ontario
- adding regulatory oversight to mortgage brokers who administer mortgages on behalf of third parties
- exemptions to educational requirements during the transition period for some individuals
- two-year licensing cycles
- introducing criteria for surrendering a license

== See also ==
- Real Estate and Business Brokers Act
