= Advocis =

Financial Advisors Association of Canada (TFAAC)

- Formerly: Life Underwriters Association of Canada (LUAC), Canadian Association of Insurance and Financial Advisors (CAIFA), Canadian Association of Financial Planners (CAFP)
- Type: Professional Association
- Industry: Financial Services
- Founded: November 2003
- Headquarters: 10 Lower Spadina Ave, Suite 700, Toronto, ON, M5V 2Z2, Canada
- Area served: Canada
- Members: 13,000+
- Website: advocis.ca

Advocis, The Financial Advisors Association of Canada (TFAAC) is the largest voluntary professional membership association of financial advisors in Canada, representing more than 13,000 members and 40 chapters across the country.

== History ==
On June 4, 1906, members of the Life Underwriters Associations of Montreal, Quebec City, Prince Edward Island and Toronto met and founded the Life Underwriters Association of Canada (LUAC) in the interest of life insurance agents, and to represent their views to government and the public.

On October 1, 1997, a resolution was passed to change the name of LUAC to the Canadian Association of Insurance and Financial Advisors (CAIFA).

On November 7, 2003, CAIFA merged with the Canadian Association of Financial Planners (CAFP) via the passage of a special act through the Federal Parliament of Canada and was formally incorporated as Advocis, The Financial Advisors Association of Canada.

== Advocacy ==
Through member-driven committees, Advocis engages with federal and provincial governments across Canada to pursue both the interests of financial advisors and the general public. In recent years, Advocis has been predominantly focused on issues related to title protection, advocating strongly for greater regulation of who is permitted to use the title of 'Financial Advisor' and 'Financial Planner' in jurisdictions across Canada. To date, such legislation has been passed in Ontario and Saskatchewan.

== Education ==
Advocis provides educational programs for a range of financial designations in Canada, including the Chartered Life Underwriter (CLU), Professional Financial Advisor (PFA) and Certified Health Insurance Specialist (CHS) designations. Advocis also offers programs for the Life License Qualification Program (LLQP) and a variety of other certificates and courses intended to meet regulatory requirements for financial advisor Continuing Education.

== FORUM Magazine ==
FORUM Magazine is a quarterly magazine published by Advocis which focuses on issues of interest to professional financial advisors. It was originally founded in 1914 by LUAC as The Life Underwriters News.

== Associated organizations ==
=== The Institute for Advanced Financial Education (IAFE) ===
As part of TFAAC prior to its incorporation, IAFE operated as the designation body and business unit of The Financial Advisors Association of Canada (TFAAC). The Institute also serves as the enforcement body for The Institute, and the Advocis Code of Professional Conduct (CPC).

=== Advocis Broker Services (ABS) ===
Advocis Broker Services is a boutique insurance agency focused on financial advisors, and specifically members of Advocis.

=== The Conference for Advanced Life Underwriting (CALU) ===
CALU is a 'sister organization' to Advocis, representing a subsection of approximately 650 Advocis members who are advanced practitioners.

=== GAMA International Canada (GAMA) ===
GAMA International Canada is the Canadian associate of GAMA International, a professional association limited to financial services professionals in managerial positions.
