= Stimulant maintenance =

Stimulant maintenance is the medical practice of prescribing stimulant substances such as cocaine or amphetamines to people with stimulant use disorders. Proponents argue that prescribed stimulants may provide a legal, pharmaceutical alternative to illicit drugs for selected patients. Pharmaceutical Dexedrine has been investigated as substitution therapy for cocaine dependence. Clinical trials of prescribed psychostimulants have shown mixed results, and they are not routinely recommended for the treatment of stimulant use disorders outside specific clinical settings or research protocols.
