= Traders Bank Building =

Early skyscraper in Toronto, Ontario

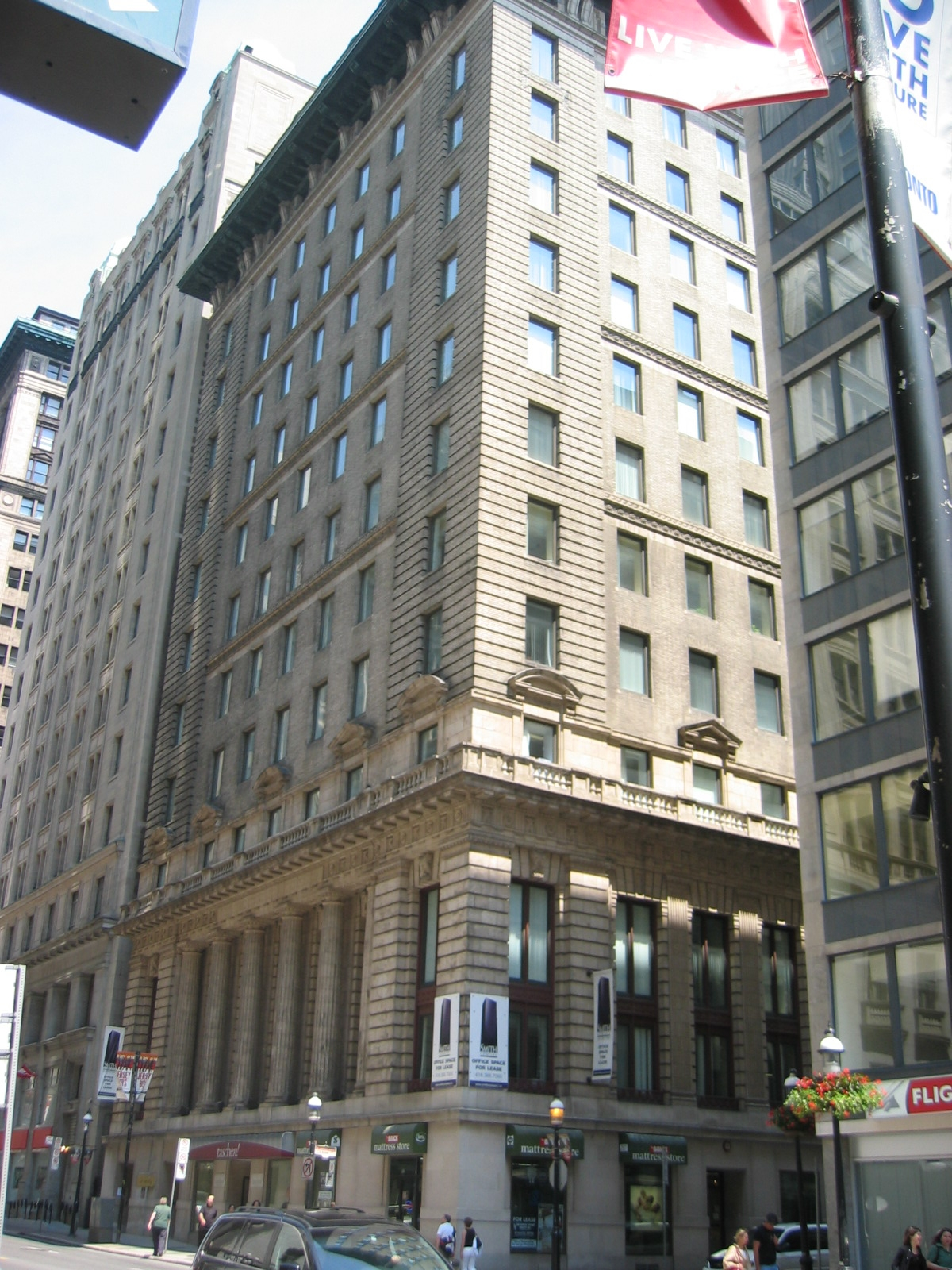
- Interactive map of the Traders Bank Building area
- Former names: Montreal Trust Building

General information
- Status: Completed
- Type: Commercial offices
- Architectural style: Neo-Classical
- Location: 67 Yonge Street; Toronto, Ontario, Canada
- Coordinates: 43.648737°N 79.377374°W
- Construction started: 1905
- Completed: 1906

Height
- Roof: 55.39 m (181.7 ft)

Technical details
- Floor count: 15

Design and construction
- Architect: Carrère and Hastings

Ontario Heritage Act
- Designated: 1976

The Traders Bank Building is a 15-storey, 55.39 m (181.7 ft) early skyscraper (the first in Toronto), completed in 1906 at 67 Yonge Street in Toronto, Ontario, Canada. The building was designed by Carrère and Hastings, with construction beginning in 1905. It was the tallest building in the British Commonwealth until the Royal Liver Building was completed in 1911. It remains one of Canada's few surviving skyscrapers of the early 20th century.

== History ==
The building was assembled using two million bricks and 1700 tons of steel beams riveted using compressed air (with "millions" of rivets needed); once the foundations were finished, it was erected at a rate of about a floor a week. The building was designed to be fireproof, thanks to the steel frame. In the event of a fire, fire doors would shut the elevators and staircases, with two large fire escapes in the rear. Steam heat on a vacuum system would warm the interior. Electric lights throughout and telephone cables on each floor were touted as features.

When described in a period newspaper, it was to have a flag pole 200 feet (61 m) above street level and four high-speed elevators going up 187 feet (57 m). It was projected to hold 1,500 people. The exterior was to be made of stone, brick and terra cotta (sourced from Perth-Amboy and used on the lower three floors) with limestone casings. The floors are made of Canadian Portland cement. The only use of wood was in the windows, doors and frames. The roof was to have a promenade, with the owner unsure if the public would be admitted.

The bank was to occupy the first two storeys.

The construction of the building was marked by several accidents and one fatality. An engineer was scalded by a faulty steam injector in November 1905.

The building was innovative in its leasing arrangements. It was the first major Toronto building to introduce the New York system of leasing by the square foot. The building was completed by early December 1906, and the bank shortly moved into its new headquarters. The Traders Bank was based in Toronto, with strong roots in rural Ontario; it would later become part of the Royal Bank of Canada, with RBC acquiring the Traders Bank in 1912.

The building's height was fairly controversial at the time. A number of the city's public intellectuals and many of its architects expressed dismay at the prospect of skyscrapers. It would overload the property values, shade the streets, and trap the disease-causing "miasmas" that still lurked in the public imagination. The Globe newspaper complained: "in the next ten or fifteen years.... The chief retail thoroughfares will then look like a Colorado canyon." Other editorials on the skyscraper theme compared Toronto to New York:

but if the skyscraper habit grows, as there is every indication it will... the lower end of Yonge Street and the central portion of King street will become dim sunless canyons such as one sees in the financial centre of New York.

The tall building changed the customary wind patterns at Yonge and Colborne. There were signs of urban canyon winds by the spring of 1909.

The City Architect in November 1907 promised that it would not start a trend and that there would be strict enforcement of the 200-foot (61 m) height limit, which was still taller than the building itself. As it turned out, the city council was usually persuaded to waive the height limits downtown, and the Traders' Bank was very shortly overtaken by even taller buildings.

== Heritage protection ==
The property is designated under Part IV of the Ontario Heritage Act since 1976. The city notes it was first known as the Traders Bank Building, later Montreal Trust. It was built in 1905–06 and designed by Carrere & Hastings in association with F.S. Baker. Part of the property to be later known as 6–8 Colborne Street was removed from the designated property in 1999, not being of architectural merit.

The designation notes: "The Montreal Trust Building, originally the Traders Bank Building, Nos. 61–67 Yonge Street at 4 Colborne Street (NE), 1905 by Carriere & Hastings; F. S. Baker, Associate is designated on architectural grounds as a notable example of French-inspired Beaux Arts classicism by a very important firm of New York architects. The building was, when finished, the tallest building in the British Empire (the first skyscraper in Toronto) and it still plays an important part in the streetscape of Yonge Street."

== See also ==
- Architecture of Toronto
- List of tallest buildings in Canada
- List of tallest buildings in Toronto
