= LLQP =

Canada licensing regime for life insurance sales people

LLQP (Life Licence Qualification Program) is part of the Canadian licensing regime for life insurance sales people. Before an advisor in the financial services sector is allowed to begin selling life insurance products, they must complete and pass LLQP, and earn a certificate of completion. Once the certification exam is completed, and criminal records checks are submitted, applicants may apply to their provincial insurance council to write the licensing exam. Once the provincial exam is completed and passed, the applicant may complete the requirements to apply for a licence to sell life insurance, accident and sickness products, and life insurance related investment products like Segregated funds and annuities. The LLQP exam certificate is valid in all provinces and territories except Quebec, which uses a separate system altogether.

LLQP is an entry-level program. In order to become eligible to work for many companies, such as Freedom 55 and Sun Life, a candidate must first complete and pass the LLQP. Upon completion of the LLQP, it is possible for the candidate to apply to write the provincial certification exam, successful completion of which will allow the candidate to apply for a certificate (often known as a licence) to sell life insurance and related products, such as annuities and segregated funds. There are two versions of the LLQP: the "full LLQP" and the LLQP Accident & Sickness (A&S). The full version combines life insurance and accident and sickness insurance training. The A&S version covers accident and sickness insurance only.

The LLQP does not provide a designation. It is simply the first hurdle toward earning a licence to practice.

Technically, most provincial insurance acts only prohibit somebody from acting as an agent if that person does not carry a licence to sell life insurance. Agent is defined as one who is financially rewarded for conducting said business.

== History ==
Canadian Insurers experienced some financial difficulties through the late 1980s, continuing on into the 1990s. This was largely the result of declining interest rates on safe, income-producing investments such as bond and treasury bill, though this was not the only problem. This led to a wave of consolidation and demutualization amongst Canadian insurers, in an effort to raise capital and cut costs. Internally, many insurers, in an effort to cut costs, chose to eliminate their in-house sales forces. Almost all 'career shops' ceased to exist during this time. There are a few major career shops remaining today, such as those run by Sun Life, Freedom 55, and IGM Financial.

When the career shop was the entry point of choice into the insurance industry, it was normal for new agents to undertake an intensive training program, usually involving a combination of in-house training, field training, and head office training. With the cost-cutting measures so prevalent through this period, it was still necessary for insurers to find ways to distribute their products. Many insurers switched to the insurance broker system. Under the brokerage system, a Managing general agent (MGA) takes on most of the responsibilities that once fell to the career shops. The difference, as far as the insurers were concerned, was in cost management. Instead of insurers tying up resources dealing with training and human resources management, this burden was now passed directly to the agents, through their MGAs.

For Canadian regulators, this led to some concerns. The Canadian Council of Insurance Regulators (CCIR) and the Canadian Insurance Services Regulatory Organization(CISRO), together in 1997, determined that the decline of career shops and the subsequent move to the MGA system would hurt consumers. The problem that would arise would be that the process that was then in place that would allow a certificate to sell life insurance to be issued was expected to be complemented by an intensive training program. Most MGAs had neither the interest nor the resources to carry out such a program. As a result, CCIR and CISRO announced that there would be a more rigorous examination and study process for those entering into the life insurance industry. The feeling was that by enforcing higher educational standards at the beginning, new agents would enter into the industry better prepared.

CCIR and CISRO entered into a consultation period, during which time they enlisted the services of education professionals, industry input, and input from other regulatory bodies. They end result was the LLQP Design Document which listed specific educational objectives. The expectation is that every new life insurance agent should know these educational objectives. The educational objectives are based on [Bloom's Taxonomy|Taxonomy of Educational Objectives].

Once the Design Document was in place, the regulators created exams that students would have to pass in order to be able to apply for certification to sell insurance. The exam originally was a 140 question five-answer multiple choice exam, with a heavy orientation towards case-study style multiple choice questions. Students would be given three hours to complete this exam. This changed slightly, and examinees are now given four hours for 140 questions.

Concurrently, the regulators determined that they wanted to avoid a scenario which had happened in the days prior to the LLQP. Under previous regimes, candidates would sometimes write an exam, fail it, write the next week, and so forth, until they had learned the proper answers to all the questions in the exam. There are anecdotal stories of candidates writing the exam twelve or more times before succeeding. This is not a valid educational process; this candidate has learned the answers to the exam questions, but does not likely understand the underlying material. In order to prevent this, it was determined that, prior to challenging the provincial certification exam, any candidate would have to first be certified by an authorized education provider. Several existing education providers were approached to develop textbooks, seminars, and exam processes to validate students in preparation for the certification exam. The intent was to guarantee that any student writing the provincial exam would be well-prepared.

Starting January 1, 2003, anybody wishing to work as an insurance agent in the common law provinces had to write their certification exam. (There are exceptions, but these are so rarely applied that they should not even be considered.) Since that time, there have been some changes to the LLQP process, but it has largely stayed intact as originally envisioned.

In 2013, CISRO began to update the design document, with the intention of changing the exam process. The new exam regime will include 4 separate exams, each focussing on one area of required expertise.

== Study process ==
A number of private companies offer LLQP training, both through online and in-class sessions. Insurance companies including Sun Life Assurance Company of Canada, Combined Insurance Company of America, Canada Life Insurance Company and Primerica Life Insurance Company of Canada are also LLQP course providers.

Industry experts and professionals and course providers recommend a student spend between 80 and 120 hours studying for the LLQP exam.

Starting in 2016, CISRO will roll out the new standardized licensing regime across Canada (including Quebec). Educational companies, such as IFSE Institute, will begin offering programs to candidates that will accommodate the new modular exams.

== Exam process ==
The LLQP Exam Process today incorporates four 35 question, multiple choice exams. Writers are given 1 hour and 15 minutes to complete each exam section. Note that bathroom breaks are not permitted for this exam. In most jurisdictions, exam writers complete a scantron sheet. There are regular exam writes hosted in major Canadian centres, and smaller centres generally have writes on a less frequent, or as-needed basis. For example, there are exam writes every second day in Toronto, while Calgary has a write every Monday.

While the exam is based on identical content in all jurisdictions, there are some differences in how the exam is conducted from jurisdiction to jurisdiction. In Saskatchewan, for example, it is necessary for a prospective agent to complete a bylaws exam concurrently with the certification exam. In most jurisdictions, a prospective agent can schedule an exam write either at any time - this is the case in British Columbia and [Ontario] - or upon completion of the exam offered by an LLQP provider, as is the case in Alberta. In [Manitoba], though, a prospective agent must have sponsorship from an insurer in place prior to being permitted to write the exam.

Upon completion of the exam, results are normally available very quickly, often the next day. The passing grade in all jurisdictions is 60%. A successful writer will be permitted to go on and apply for a life insurance certificate. An unsuccessful writer will be given two more attempts, for a total of three, and then required to wait six months before writing again. If that further attempt is unsuccessful, then the candidate must wait another six months, and so on.

Feedback from an unsuccessful write is generally not available. The insurance councils do not release old exam questions, nor do they indicate to candidates which questions were answered correctly and incorrectly. In some jurisdictions, it is possible to obtain a breakdown indicating, by topic, which areas a student was strong in, and where a student needs to improve.

The Canadian Council of Insurance Regulators (CCIR) maintains an LLQP provider results list that outlines each provider, exam type, number of exams written and pass rate.

Upon completion of the exam, there is no designation granted. Completion of this process simply allows somebody to apply for a certificate to work as an insurance agent. Application is done through the licensing regulatory body for the specific province.

== Results of the LLQP process ==
The LLQP process initially came under, and sometimes is still subject to, criticism. It was criticized for making entry into the insurance industry too challenging, and there was a fear that recruiting by insurers and managing general agents would suffer. While there are some who are still critical of the LLQP, statistics maintained by provincial insurance regulators indicate that renewal rates for licenses sit at approximately 94% year over year, a significant improvement as compared to the pre-LLQP era, when renewal rates were typically around 85% year over year. The system stands overhauled jan 2016.
