= Real Estate and Business Brokers Act =

Law of Ontario, Canada regulating real estate businesses

The Real Estate and Business Brokers Acts is the legislation regulating the individual brokers and businesses registered to trade in real estate in Ontario, Canada. The most recent version, the Real Estate and Business Brokers Acts, 2002, came into force in Ontario, Canada on March 31, 2006. Sections 50 to 53, dealing with the creation of regulations, were enabled on November 7, 2005. Section 8, dealing with specialist certifications, has yet to be proclaimed. REBBA is administered by the Real Estate Council of Ontario on behalf of the Ontario Ministry of Consumer Services.

The Real Estate and Business Brokers Act, 2002 (French: Loi de 2002 sur le courtage commercial et immobilier), replaces the Real Estate and Business Brokers Act (French: Loi sur le courtage commercial et immobilier) of 1990. Notable changes with the new legislation include:

- modernized framework for registering and regulating brokerages, brokers and salespersons
- rules of trading moved from previous Act to new Act's Regulations
- procedures and programs previously found in RECO by-laws, e.g., insurance, continuing education, code of ethics and complaints process
- increased maximum fines for violations of the Act

The first Real Estate Brokers Act was passed in Ontario in 1930.

== See also ==
- Mortgage Brokerages, Lenders and Administrators Act
