= Pharmascience =

Canadian pharmaceutical manufacturer

Pharmascience Inc.
- Type: Private
- Industry: Pharmaceutical
- Founded: 1983
- Founders: Morris Goodman, Ted Wise
- Headquarters: Montreal, Quebec, Canada
- Key people: Jim Vounassis, CEO
- Products: Generic & Branded Drugs
- Revenue: $485 million
- Number of employees: 1,600
- Website: pharmascience.com

Pharmascience Inc. is a Quebec-based pharmaceutical company founded by pharmacists Morris Goodman and Ted Wise in 1983. Pharmascience Inc. is headquartered in Montreal and distributes its products to more than 50 countries.

== History ==
In 1983, Pharmascience Inc. was founded by two pharmacists, Morris Goodman and Ted Wise. Its research and development (R&D) activities started with a team of five employees.

In 1988, Pharmascience Inc. acquired and opened a drug production facility in Montreal.

In 1994, the company began its international expansion and opened an office in Kyiv, Ukraine.

In 1995, Pharmascience Inc. partnered with Health Partners International of Canada (HPIC). Since then, the pharmaceutical company has donated $72 million worth of medicine.

In 1996, Pharmascience Inc. invested $2 million in the creation of modern research laboratories of a pilot production plant in Montreal. In 1998, the company invested $8 million for the acquisition of a building intended to house its head office, administrative centre and operating activities, in the west end of Montreal. A year later, the organization invested $3 million to build an ultra-modern distribution centre, across from the Montreal head office. While working on the construction of the distribution centre in 1999, Pharmascience Inc. announced a total investment of $50 million to expand and modernize its infrastructure and create 200 new jobs over the next five years.

In 2000, Pharmascience Inc. implemented a partnership with the government (Investissement Québec and Emploi Québec).

In 2003, the company invested $12 million for the acquisition of PanGeo Pharma, a Quebec pharmaceutical company, and hired approximately 125 employees.

In 2007, Pharmascience Inc. opened a representative office in Vietnam. The same year, the Pharmascience Inc and Centraide campaigns were launched.

In 2011, the organization invested $38 million to open new laboratories in Montreal, which created 180 jobs by the next year. Also in 2011, Pharmascience Inc. acquired Aegera Therapeutics, a Montreal-based clinical-stage biotechnology company.

In 2012, the company obtained its Class A Operational Excellence certification for customer service and also implemented its Next Generation Leaders (NGL) program.

The following year, Pharmascience Inc. inaugurated its new distribution centre in Dorval. The same year, the company announced its association with the South Korean company Korea Kolmar Holdings, to create Pharmascience Korea and to distribute Canadian pharmaceuticals in South Korea in 2014.

In 2014, Pharmascience Inc. acquired Uman Pharma Inc., a fully integrated company that develops, manufactures and markets generic injectable pharmaceutical products. The same year, Pharmascience Inc. opened its office on the South Shore, in Candiac and its office in Saudi Arabia.

In 2015, the company announced an investment program of $55.7 million by the end of 2016, to modernize its infrastructure and increase its research and development (R&D) capacity.

In 2019, Pharmascience Inc. signed a partnership agreement with the PHOENIX group in Mannheim, Germany. Additionally, the organization launched its Royalmount Laboratories division in Montreal, a division specialized in bioanalytics and cannabis testing. Also in 2019, Pharmascience Inc. signed a partnership agreement with Sama AlFayhaa, the largest pharmaceutical company in southern Iraq, in the same year.

== About Pharmascience Inc.'s Founders ==
=== Dr. Morris Goodman ===
Morris Goodman, born in 1931 in Montreal to Ukrainian parents, is a figure of Canadian entrepreneurship and a pioneer of the generic drug industry.

Morris Goodman studied pharmacy at University of Montreal, in the same class as Jean Coutu. He completed his studies in 1953, at the age of 21. While he was still in university, he founded his first pharmaceutical distribution company with a friend: Winley-Morris.

After graduating, Dr. Goodman became interested in the industrial side of pharmacy. Soon after, several international companies granted him distribution rights to market their products in the Canadian market, which he marketed under the name Winley-Morris Co. Ltée. In 1953, he was offered to distribute a treatment for tuberculosis.

In 1971, he approached the California-based International Chemical & Nuclear Corporation (ICN) and became the Canadian distributor of L-dopa. Impressed by his innovative approach, ICN purchased Winley-Morris and offered Morris Goodman the presidency of ICN Canada. Goodman spent a total of 12 years working at ICN Canada.

In 1983, at the age of 52, Dr. Goodman founded Pharmascience Inc. with his friend and colleague Ted Wise. Serving as both the co-founder and chairman of the board, he is behind the significant growth of the company, which is today one of the three largest generic pharmaceutical companies in Canada and the largest pharmaceutical employer in Quebec today.

Dr. Goodman has always been a philanthropist, in addition to being a pharmacist and businessman. Through the Morris & Rosalind Goodman Foundation, the foundation created by Dr. Goodman and his wife Rosalind in 2005, he financed, among other projects, The Stroke Unit at the Jewish General Hospital of Montreal, the Agora at the Faculty of Pharmacy at the University of Montreal, and The Rosalind & Morris Goodman Cancer Research Centre at McGill University, as well as, more recently, the CHU Sainte-Justine's Goodman Pediatric Formulations Centre.

In 2015, Morris Goodman published his book “To Make a Difference,” an autobiography that includes testimonials about his colleagues and collaborators.

=== Ted Wise ===
Ted S. Wise, who died in 2013, was a pharmacist. He co-founded Pharmascience Inc. in 1983 and also served as chairman and vice chairman of the board of directors. He was chairman of the board of directors and independent director of Paladin Labs Inc. from 1995 until 2012, when he was named chairman emeritus.

Dr. Goodman obtained his bachelor's degree in commerce from McGill University, and his Ph.D. in pharmacology from the University of Virginia. Upon graduation, he began his career at Pharmascience in Business Development, before taking charge of the future of the company, both in Canada and internationally.

Under Goodman's leadership and thanks to his investment in internal and external research and development (R&D) programs, Pharmascience Inc. has grown from a Canadian company to an international leader in the market.

== Commercial Business Divisions ==
=== Pharmascience Canada ===
Pharmascience Canada is a division of Pharmascience Inc. which has two types of products: private labels and Over-the-Counter drugs (OTC).

Pharmascience Canada provides private label non-prescription drugs to major Canadian grocery and drugstore chains, as well as to distributors. It markets more than 20 brands across different product categories, mainly gastrointestinal (GI) and Cough & Cold.

The division also manufactures different OTC brands: Prospan by Helixia, Lax A Day, Hemovel, Rhinaris and Pediatric Electrolyte for Kids.

=== Pharmascience International ===
Pharmascience International is a division of Pharmascience Inc., a full-service pharmaceutical company that develops and supplies high-quality products to patients and healthcare professionals in over 60 countries.

Pharmascience International has a direct presence in the following countries: Vietnam, Kingdom of Saudi Arabia (also responsible for United Arab Emirates, Kuwait, Bahrain, Qatar and Oman), South Korea and Ukraine.

The company also has partnerships with local distributors (business-to-business) to complete the offer of leading generic drug companies in local markets.

=== Pendopharm ===
Pendopharm is a division of Pharmascience Inc. founded in 2011, which is responsible for marketing products in Canada that were designed in other countries. In addition to marketing, the division is involved in licensing, partnership, and development of specialty prescription medicines and consumer healthcare products.

For prescription products, Pendopharm specializes in several different therapeutic classes: gastroenterology, orthopedics and specialty medicine.

For consumer products, Pendopharm offers over-the-counter and behind-the-counter products for adults and children in the following therapeutic areas: allergies, colds and coughs, gastroenterology, nose care, and pediatrics.

=== Royalmount Laboratories ===
Royalmount Laboratories is a division of Pharmascience Inc. in analytical services founded in 2019. The laboratory specializes in bioanalytics and cannabis testing. It is equipped to meet the tests required by Health Canada for companies legally authorized to produce, sell or distribute cannabis.
