= Real Estate Council of Ontario =

Canadian not-for-profit corporation

The Real Estate Council of Ontario is a not-for-profit corporation that regulates the trade of real estate in Ontario, Canada. Established in 1997, it works on behalf of the Government of Ontario to administer and enforce the Real Estate and Business Brokers Act and its regulations.

In Ontario, any individual or business trading in real estate must be registered with the council. As of July 31, 2017, there were more than 80,000 real estate registrants (salespersons, brokers and brokerages) in the province.

== Governance ==
It is governed by a 12-member board of directors, comprising nine registered real estate professionals elected by their peers and three non-registrants appointed by the Ministry of Public and Business Service Delivery and Procurement to represent consumers, business and government. Board members serve a three-year term. The Chair is Glenda Brindle. The Vice-Chair is Rebecca Ryder.

The duties of enforcing the Act are the responsibility of the Registrar, Joseph Richer.

== Complaints ==
Anyone with concerns about the service provided by a real estate professional can submit a complaint on complaint forms which are available on the council's website. Once a complaint is received an investigation may be made. The Registrar will determine an appropriate response. It does not have authority to resolve financial or contractual disputes or provide any form of compensation to a complainant. The “Registrant Search” feature on RECO’s website allows consumers to confirm whether they are dealing with someone who is legally registered to trade in real estate in Ontario and whether that person has been the subject of any discipline activity.

== Resource ==
Registrar Joseph Richer answers common questions from home buyers and sellers in a weekly “Ask Joe” column appearing in the Saturday edition of the Toronto Star.
