= Canadian Real Estate Association =

Canadian trade association

The Canadian Real Estate Association
- Abbreviation: CREA
- Founded: 1943; 83 years ago
- Headquarters: Ottawa, Ontario, Canada
- Region served: Canada
- Members: 160,000+
- Key people: Valérie Paquin (Chair); Janice Myers (CEO)
- Website: www.crea.ca

The Canadian Real Estate Association (CREA; French: L'Association canadienne de l'immobilier, ACI) is a trade association that represents real estate brokers, agents, and salespeople in Canada. CREA's membership includes over 160,000 individuals, working through 61 real estate boards and associations across Canada.

== History ==
CREA was formed in April 1943.

The association is governed by an elected board of directors, which has representation from each region of Canada and features director-at-large positions. The board of CREA currently comprises 16 seats.

In 2024, the Canadian Competition Bureau launched an investigation into CREA over the association's buyer's commission policies.

== See also ==
- List of real estate topics
- National Association of Realtors
- Real estate broker
- Real estate trends
