= Civil Code of the Philippines =

Private law in the Philippines

Congress of the Philippines
- Long title: An Act to Ordain and Institute The Civil Code of the Philippines
- Citation: Republic Act No. 386
- Territorial extent: Philippines
- Enacted by: Code Commission with the advice and consent of the Philippine Legislature
- Enacted: June 18, 1949
- Signed: June 18, 1949
- Effective: August 30, 1950

Repeals
- Executive Order No. 209 (Family Code of the Philippines); Presidential Decree No. 603 (Child and Youth Welfare Code)

Keywords
- Civil law (Private law)
- Status: In force

The Civil Code of the Philippines is the product of the codification of private law in the Philippines. It is the general law that governs family and property relations in the Philippines. It was enacted in 1950, and remains in force to date with some significant amendments.

== History ==
The Philippine Civil Code is strongly influenced by the Spanish Civil Code, which was first enforced in 1889 within the Philippines when it was still a colony of the Spanish Empire. The Código Civil remained in effect even throughout the American Occupation; by 1940, the Commonwealth Government of President Manuel Luis Quezon formed a Commission tasked with drafting a new Code. The Commission was initially headed by Chief Justice Ramón Avanceña, but its work was interrupted by the Japanese invasion and the Second World War. The Commission's records were later destroyed by Allied bombing during the Battle of Manila in 1945.

In 1947, President Manuel Roxas of the Third Republic created a new Code Commission, this time headed by the former Dean of the University of the Philippines College of Law, Jorge Bocobo. Among the members of this new Commission were future Supreme Court Associate Justice Francisco R. Capistrano, and future senator Arturo Tolentino. The Code Commission completed the final draft of the new Civil Code by December 1947, and this was submitted to Congress, which enacted it into law through Republic Act No. 386. The Civil Code took effect in 1950.

Due to its wide coverage and impact, the Civil Code is the subject of much study and extensive commentary. Several legal luminaries developed reputations as experts on the Civil Code and consequently enhanced their reputations in the field of Philippine law. These include Tolentino, who himself had helped draft it, Supreme Court Associate Justices J. B. L. Reyes, Flérida Ruth P. Romero, José Vitug, and Edgardo Paras.

== Content ==
The influence of the Spanish Civil Code is most evident in the books on property, succession and obligations and contracts. The law on succession, for example, retains such concepts indigenous to Spain such as the rule on legitimes and reserva troncal. On the other hand, many of the provisions on special contracts, particularly on sales, are derived from common law as practised in the United States, reflecting the influence of American colonial rule and the influx of commercial relations involving Americans at the time.

The great mass of disputes between private persons over civil and property relations are resolved by applying the provisions of the Civil Code. With over 2,000 specific provisions, the Civil Code attempts to anticipate all possible questions arising from civil and property relations and prescribe a definitive solution for these problems. Understandably, the Civil Code itself is unable to provide a definite answer for all emerging problems; thus the courts also rely on precedent based on interpretations by the Supreme Court. This the Civil Code itself notably recognises in saying that "[j]udicial decisions applying or interpreting the laws or the Constitution shall form a part of the legal system of the Philippines" (Article 8, Civil Code), a recognition of the eminent role now played by precedents in Philippine law. The Civil Code is divided into four “books”, with each specific book namely:

=== Persons and family relations ===
The Chapter 2 of the Civil code was formulated to indicate certain norms that spring from the fountain of good conscience, that will serve as golden threads through society to the end of that law may approach its supreme ideal which is sway and dominance of justice, the primary precept of this portion is derived from Justinian's Institutes: iuris praecepta sunt haec: honeste vivere, alterum non laedere, suum cuique tribuere. (Inst. 1,1,3-4). (Translated into English: “the precepts of law are these: to live honestly, to injure no one, [and] to give to each his own.”). Civil personality defines the distinction between natural and juridical persons, as well as the difference between juridical capacity and capacity to act.

- Effect and Application of Laws
- Human relations
- Civil Personality
- Citizenship and Domicile
- Funerals
- Care and Education of Children
- Use of Surnames
- Absence
- Civil Register

==== The Family Code ====
In 1987, President Corazon Aquino enacted into law the Family Code of 1987, which supplanted Book I of the Civil Code concerning persons and family relations.

=== Property, ownership and its modifications ===
Focuses on property, which classifies and defines the different kinds of appropriable objects, provides for their acquisitions and loss and treats the nature and consequences of real right. Ownership is independent and general right of the person to control a thing particularly in his possession, enjoyment, disposition, and recovery, subject to no restrictions except those imposed by the state or private persons, without prejudice to the provisions of the law.

- Classification of Property
- Ownership
- Co-Ownership
- Special Properties
- Possession
- Usufruct
- Easement and Servitudes
- Nuissance
- Registry of Property

=== Modes of acquiring ownership ===
Ownership is acquired by occupation and by intellectual creation. Ownership and other real rights over property are acquired and transmitted by law, by donation, by testate and intestate succession, and in consequence of certain contracts by tradition. They may be also acquired by acquisitive prescription.

- Occupation
- Intellectual creation
- Donation
- Succession
- Acquisitive prescription

=== Obligations and contracts ===
Law of obligations is defined as juridical necessity to give, to do or not do. A contract is a meeting of the minds between two persons whereby one binds himself with respect to the other to give something or to render some service.

- Obligations
- Contracts
- Special contracts encompasses several classes of contracts as trusts, sales, barter, lease, loan, deposit, aleatory contracts, compromises, guaranty, agency, pledges, mortgage, antichresis, and partnership
- Quasi-contract
- Quasi-delict

=== Torts and damages ===
Developments in torts and damages law in the Philippines are mostly guided by judicial precedents. However, the Civil Code does provide several pertinent provisions regarding quasi-delicts, as well as provisions on damages. Damages can be incurred when there is harm done and what may be recovered arising from wrongful, unwrongful and tortuous act. Damages can be actual or compensatory, moral, nominal, temperate or moderate, liquidated and exemplary or corrective.

== See also ==
- Philippine legal codes
