= Tenancy deposit scheme =

Tenancy deposit scheme may refer to:

- Tenancy deposit scheme (England and Wales)
- Tenancy deposit schemes (Scotland)

== See also ==
- Damage deposit
