= Quasi-tort =

Quasi-tort is a legal term that is sometimes used to describe unusual tort actions, on the basis of a legal doctrine that some legal duty exists which cannot be classified strictly as negligence in a personal duty resulting in a tort nor as a contractual duty resulting in a breach of contract, but rather some other kind of duty recognizable by the law. It has been used, for example, to describe a tort for strict liability arising out of product liability, although this is typically simply called a 'tort'.

Although it is not to be found in most legal dictionaries, it has been used by some scholars such as Sri Lankan Lakshman Marasinghe. Lakshman proposes that the doctrine provides legal relief that falls outside tort or contract, but with some of the characteristics of tort or contract, as can be found in restitution (including unjust enrichment), equity (including unconscionable conduct), beneficiaries under a trust of the benefit of a promise, people protected by the valid assignment of promise, fiduciary duty, and contracts of insurance.

== As a third type of civil wrong ==
In Tort Theory, Lakshman Marasinghe posits that quasi-delict, a doctrine in civil law jurisdictions, exists as well in common law. Marasinghe thus argues against Viscount Haldane's dictum in Sinclair v Brougham, that the only common law civil causes of action are, by definition, contract and tort.

Brooklyn Law School's law review had an article with a similar argument, "Contractor Duty to Third Parties Not in Privity: A Quasi-Tort Solution to the Vexing Problem of Victims of Nonfeasance."

Malta recognizes quasi-tort as a third type of liability. Belgium also has quasi-tort.

== As a violation of a statutory or regulatory scheme ==
Tort law has been modified by statute to expand protection, and limit liability. Many tort law statutes have their origins in common law, and are interpreted through common law. These include worker's compensation, insurance law, consumer protection laws, labor law, products liability law, energy law, compensation to relatives on death, anti-discrimination law, and other miscellaneous and difficult-to-categorize areas of law. This may include statutory law or administrative regulation that define, aid interpretation (construction), provide means to calculate quantum of damages, clarify personal responsibility, or replace torts with their origins in common law.

== As a miscellaneous type of wrong-doing ==
Lakshman suggests there may be scholars who have viewed certain recently created torts, such as negligent infliction of emotional distress, as quasi-torts.

Raymond T. Nimmer used the term in:- "Restatement (Second) of Torts section 552 on negligent misrepresentation ... deals with a quasi-tort, quasi-contract form of liability."

Lakshman Marasinghe posits that it is a category where the wrong is both a contract and a tort, such as with legal malpractice, or medical malpractice. For example, New York law applies the same statute of limitations "for medical, dental or podiatric malpractice to be commenced within two years and six months," whether under contract or tort theories.

Some equity actions can be viewed as quasi-torts, such as quiet title and qui tam actions.

== See also ==
- Equity (law)
- Joint and several liability
- Jurisprudence
- Quasi-criminal
- Quasi-contract
- Quasi-delict
- Quasi-property
