= Guardaval Castle =

Ruined castle in Switzerland

- Madulain
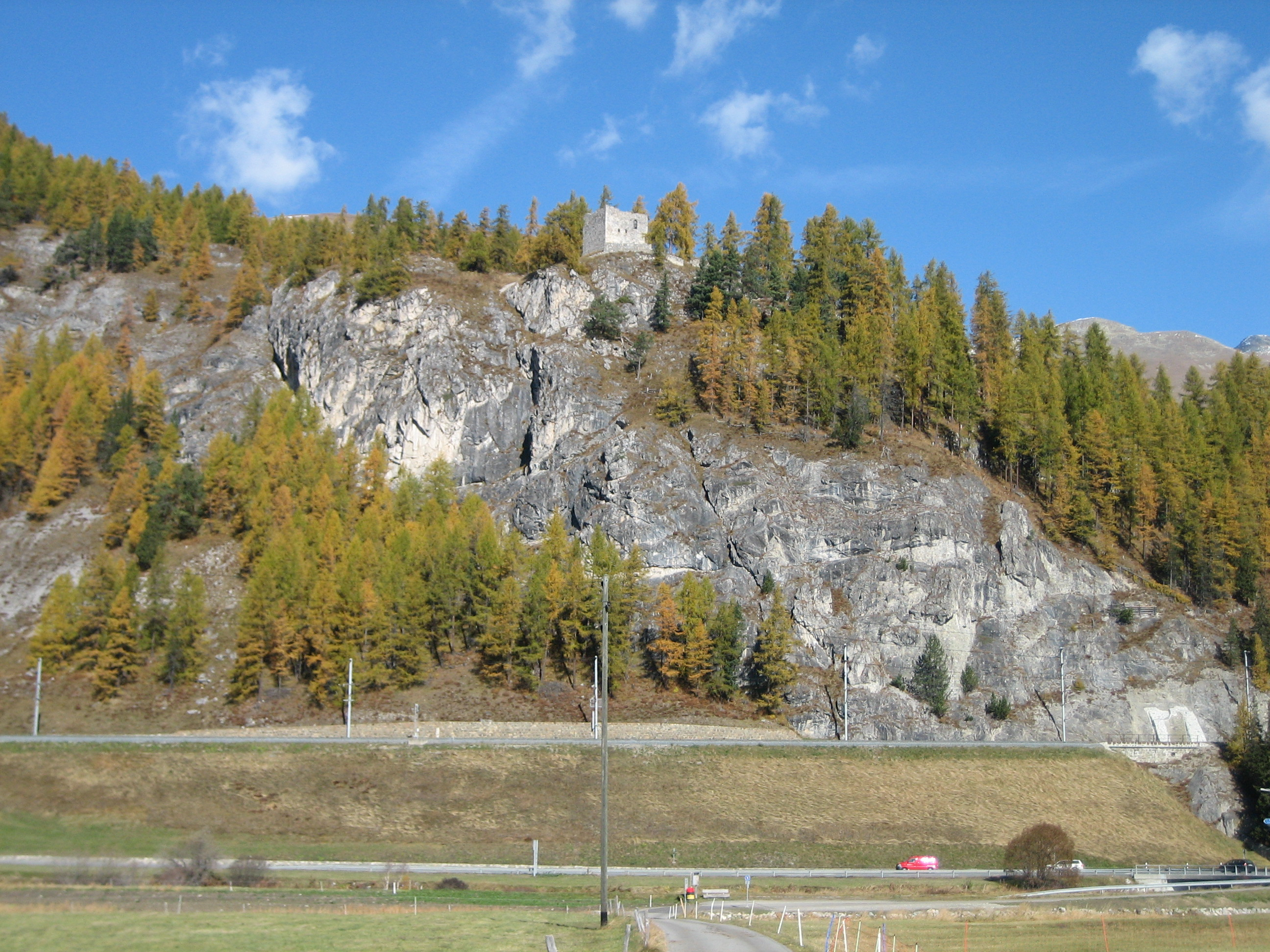
- Ruins of Guardaval

Site information
- Type: hill castle
- Code: CH-GR
- Condition: Ruin

Location
- Location within Canton of Graubünden Location within Switzerland
- Coordinates: 46°35′08″N 9°55′59.59″E
- Height: 1,785 m above the sea

Site history
- Built: 13th century

Guardaval Castle is a ruined castle in the municipality of Madulain of the Canton of Graubünden in Switzerland.

== History ==
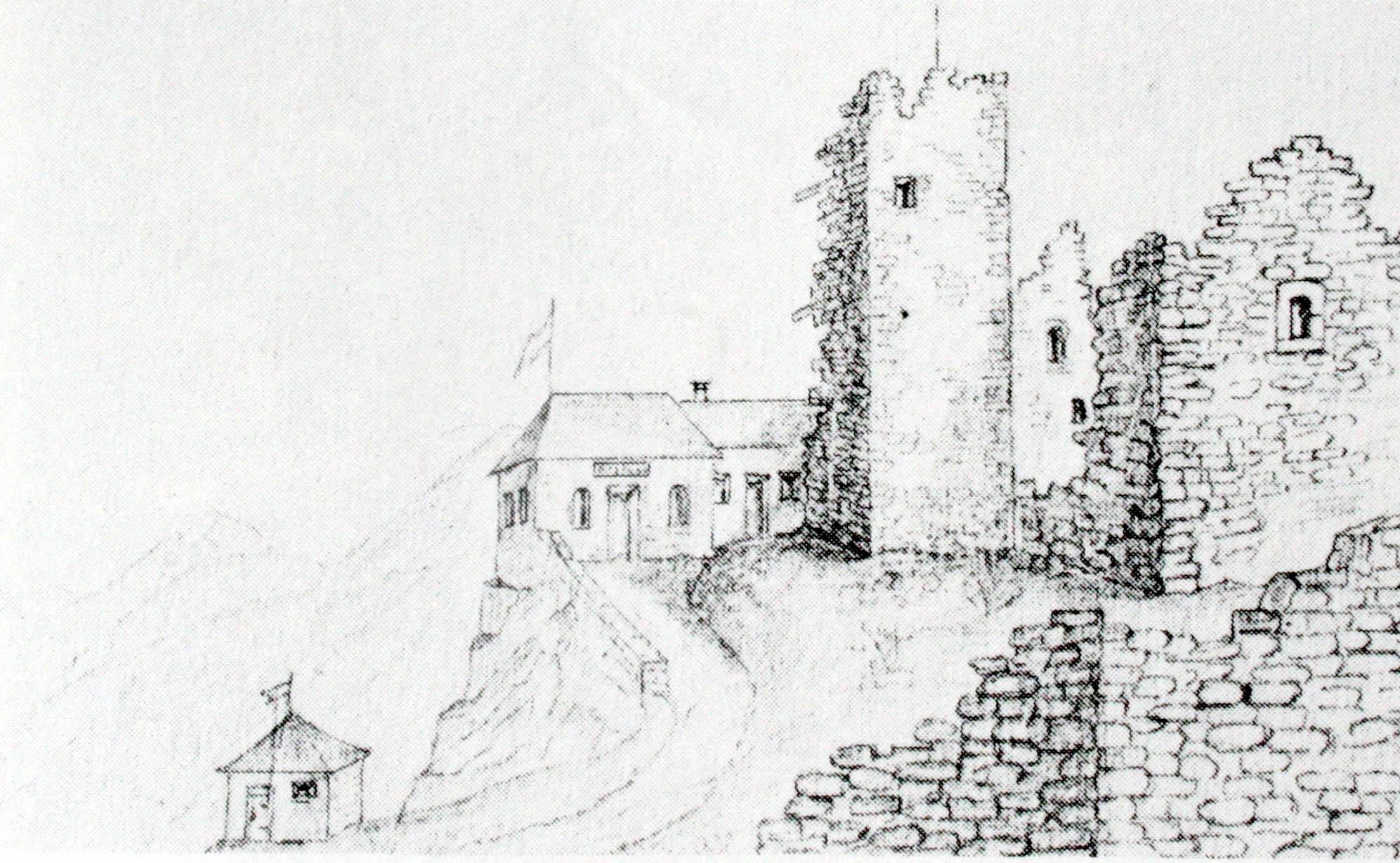
Guardval Castle and restaurant around 1880

Guardaval Castle was built around 1250 near the village of Madulain to administer the estates of the Bishop of Chur in the Upper Engadine by Bishop Volkard von Neuenburg. The castle sat along the Albula Pass road and collected tolls from travelers going over the pass. The castle was an important administrative center for the bishops; they often took up residence in the castle and ordered their vassals to frequently repair and hold it always available to them. Originally the castle consisted of just the main tower. The second building phase added a curtain wall, a gatehouse to the south; a zwinger, or outer courtyard; and a residential wing to the east.

In the 14th century the castle was granted to the wealthy Planta family from nearby Zuoz. The Planta family held a number of estates throughout the Engadine region as well as the rights to mine in the valley and fish on its lakes. Throughout the 14th century, they held the castle as a fief and sometimes as collateral for a loan that they gave the bishop. In 1359 the bishop visited the castle and issued documents from his residence in castro nostro Wardenwall.

In 1367 the Planta family supported the creation of the League of God's House to curtail the power of the bishops. The bishop, trying to retain his power base at Guardaval, required Thomas von Planta (in 1377) and his son Jacob (in 1382) to swear that they would always hold the castle open for the bishop and keep it in good repair. In 1409 the Bishop had to pledge the castle to the League of God's House to pay off some of his debts. Under the League, the castle was no longer an administrative center and was abandoned by 1500, falling into ruin.

In 1550 Ulrich Campell recorded that the castle was nearly undamaged, but abandoned and empty. By the 17th century it had fallen into ruin. In the 19th century a restaurant was built in the ruins. Most of the southern wall and gatehouse were destroyed during construction. Around 1935 the castle ruins were repaired and stabilized. The restaurant was completely dismantled and removed at the same time.

The legend that the castle was once the home of a wicked bailiff who abused and raped local women before his murder at the hands of the local villagers has no basis in fact. Rather the Planta family had generally good relations with the local villages and there are no records of there ever being a bailiff at the castle.

== Site ==
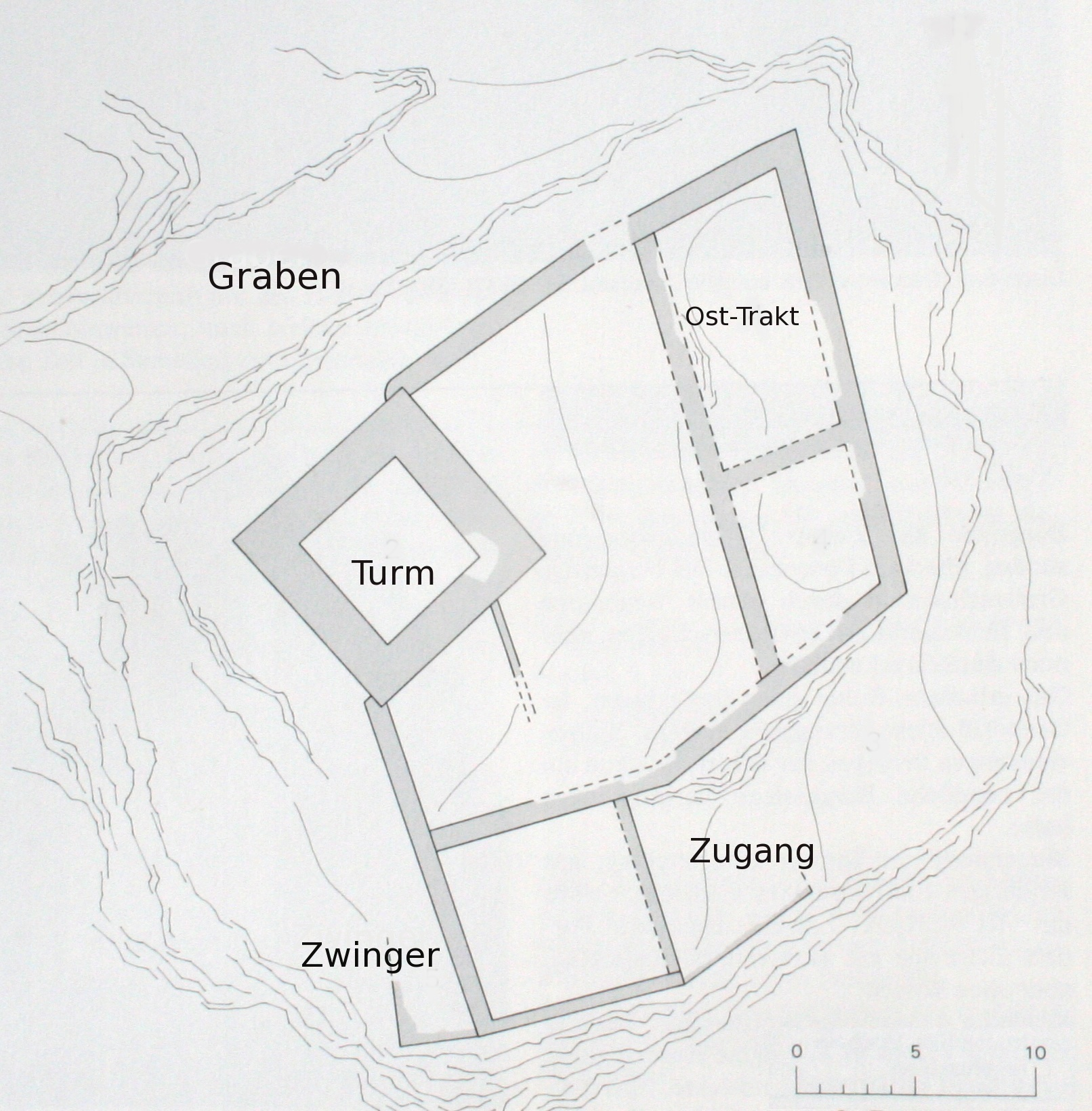
Plan of Guardaval Castle

The castle is located on a hill west of the village of Madulain. A marked walking trail leads from the train station to the castle. The trail climbs up the eastern side of the hill and arrives at an entrance in the south-east corner. The castle was protected on the mountain or north side by a ditch. The main tower is on the west side of the complex. Some of the medieval plaster and even the trowel marks are still visible on the tower. The high entrance is located on the south side on the second level. The tower is about 10 meters (33 ft) tall. The holes for heavy wooden beams that once supported a wooden balcony or platform are still visible near the top of the tower.

The main gate was on the south side of the complex, but was destroyed during construction of the late 17th century restaurant. The ring wall is an irregular rectangle with the tower forming much of the western side. The eastern side of the courtyard has a residential wing with two large rooms.

== Name ==
The modern name Guardaval comes from the Romansh verb guardar, meaning to watch or observe. The Germanic verb wardon has a similar meaning. The castle was originally called Wardenwall (1359) and Waraual (1382), with the Romansh name becoming common much later.

== Gallery ==
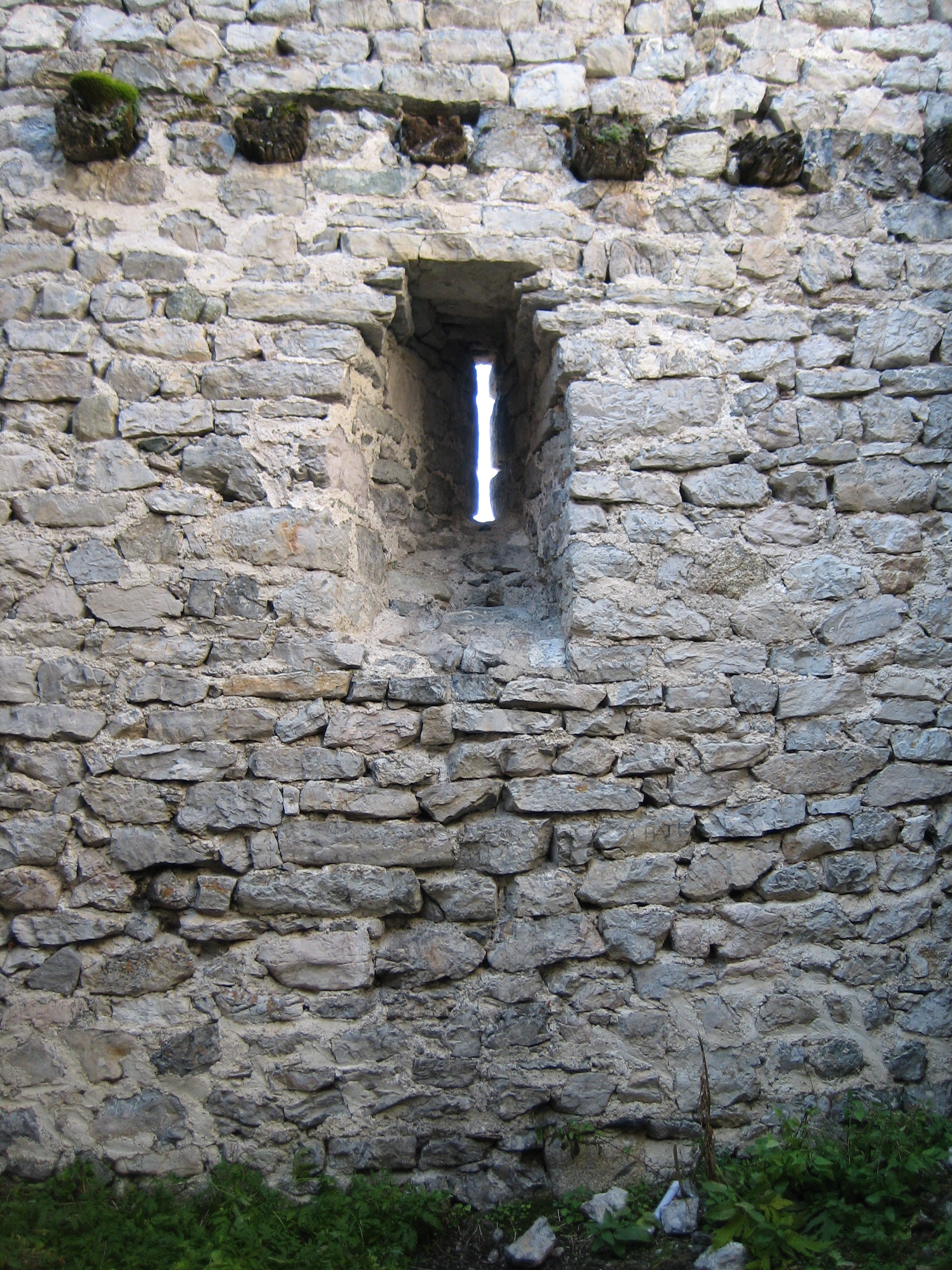
Arrow slit and support beams for a platform

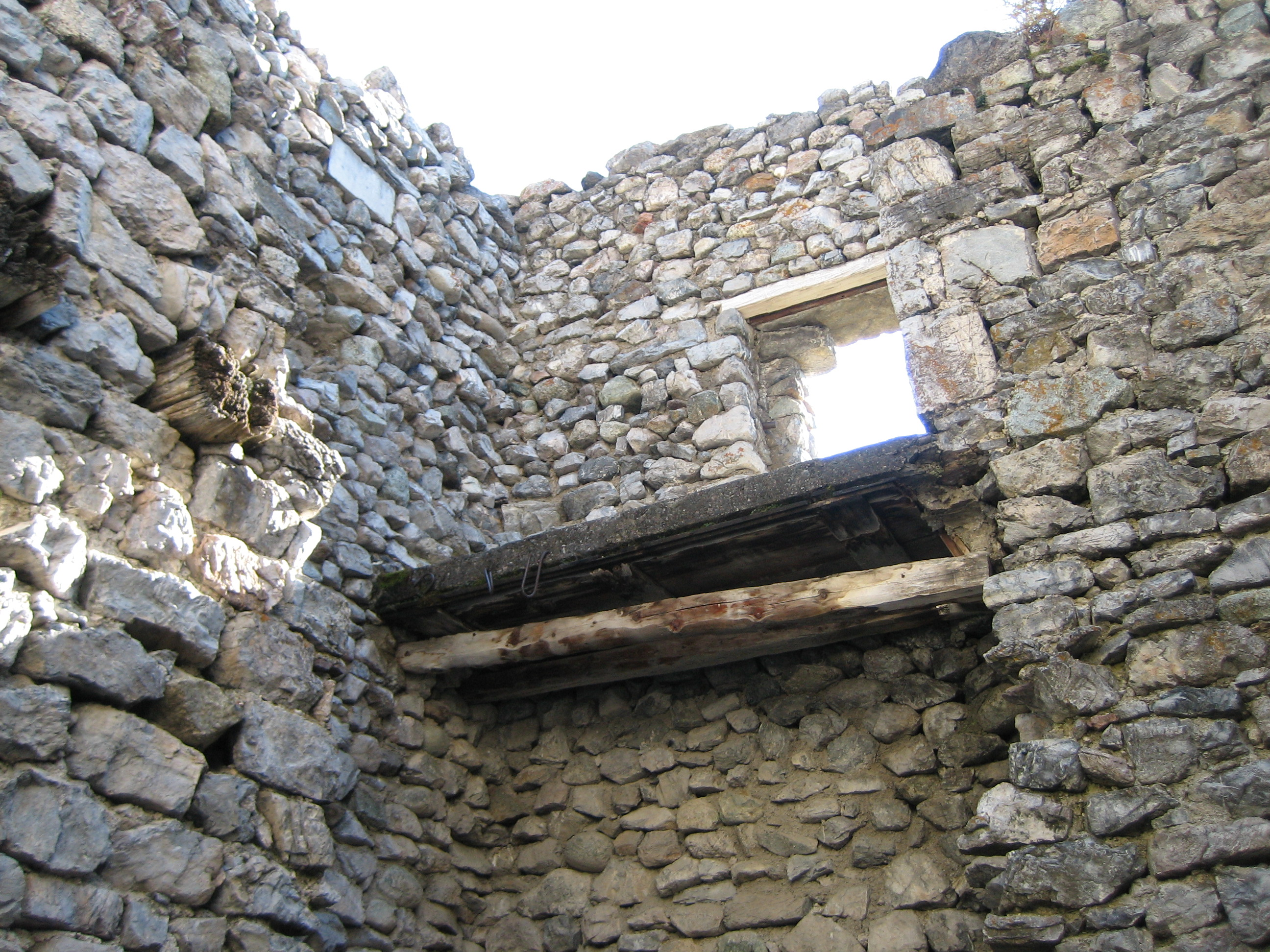
High entrance from inside

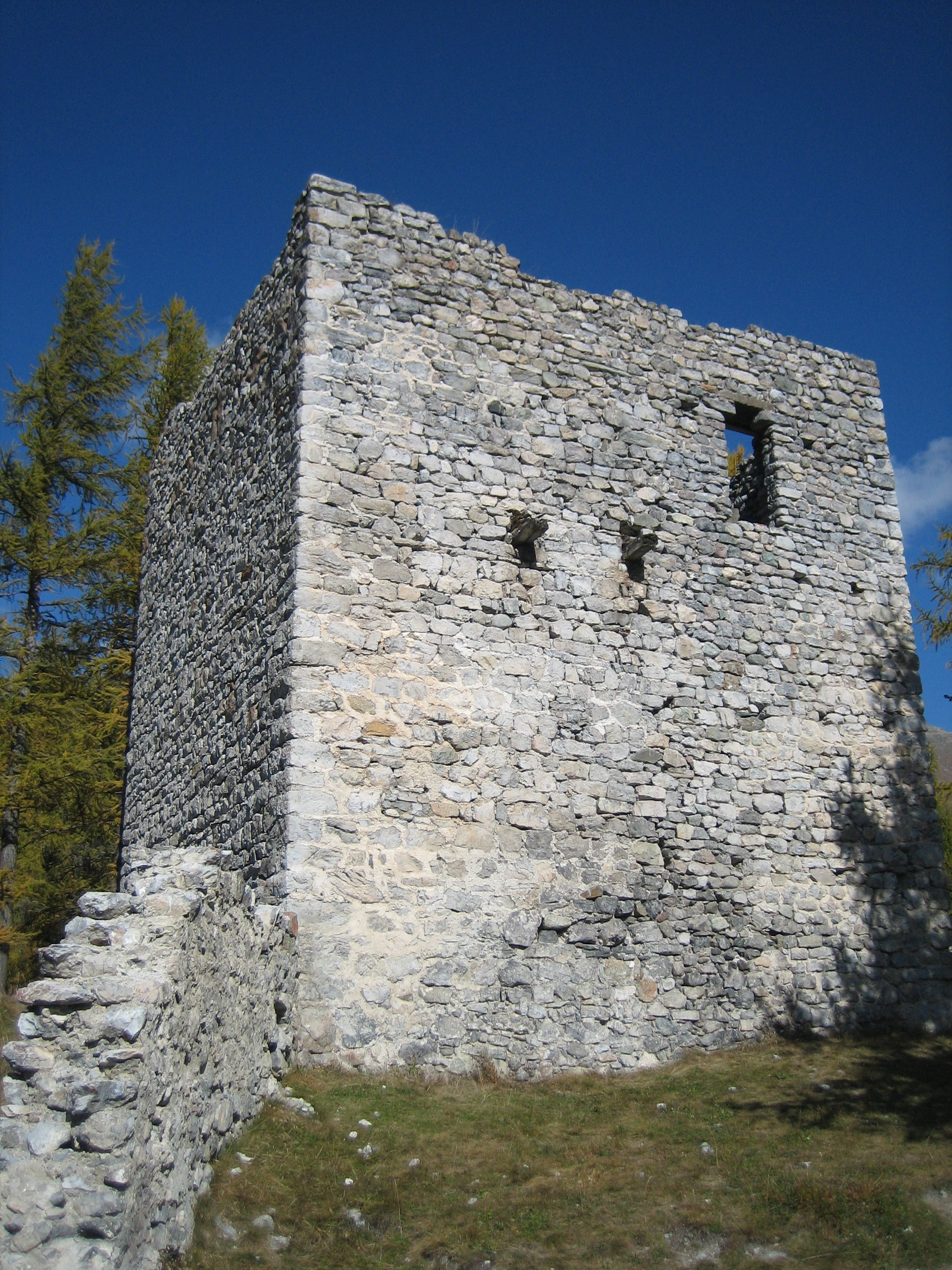
South side with high entrance visible

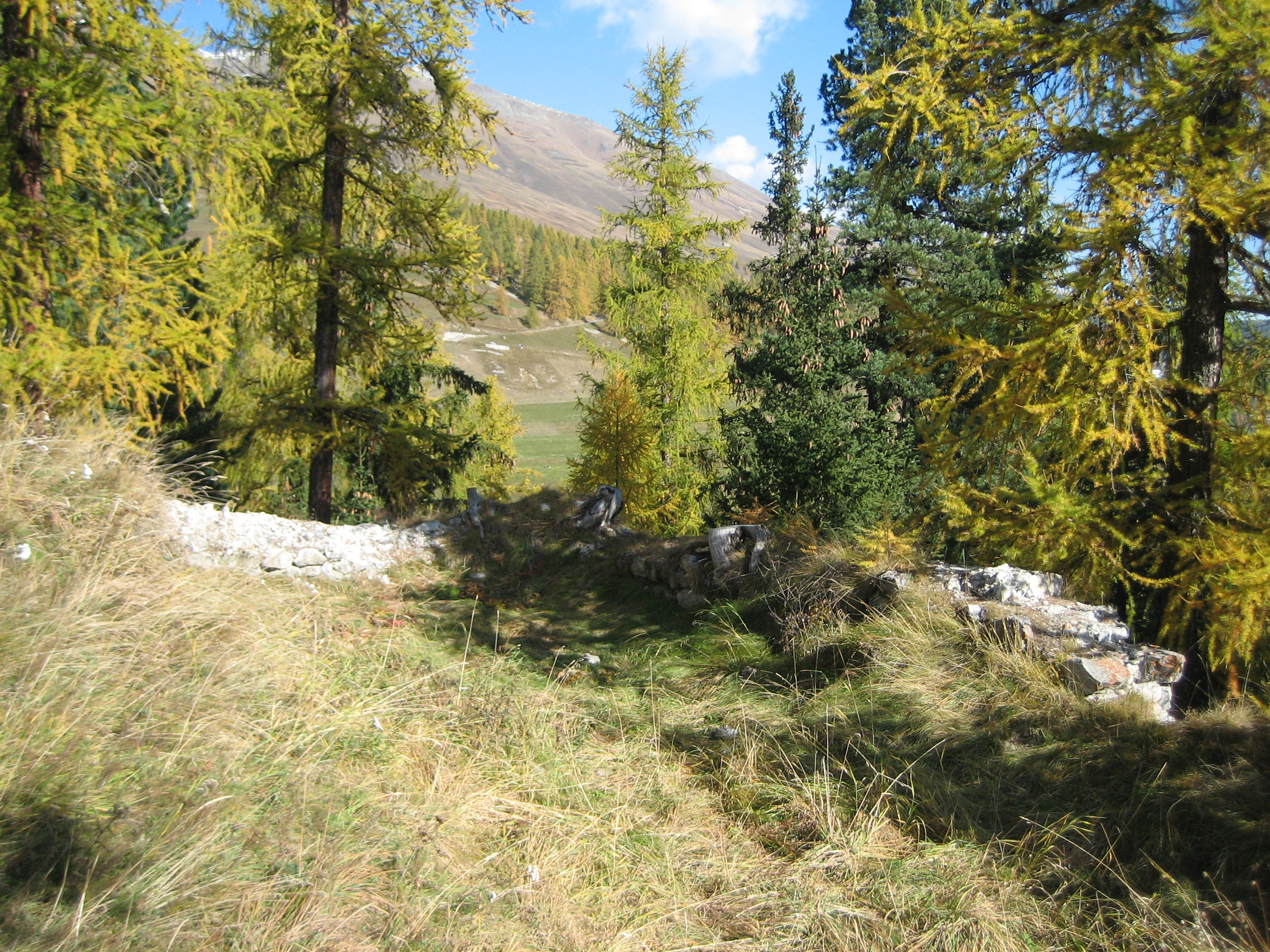
Ruins of the east wing

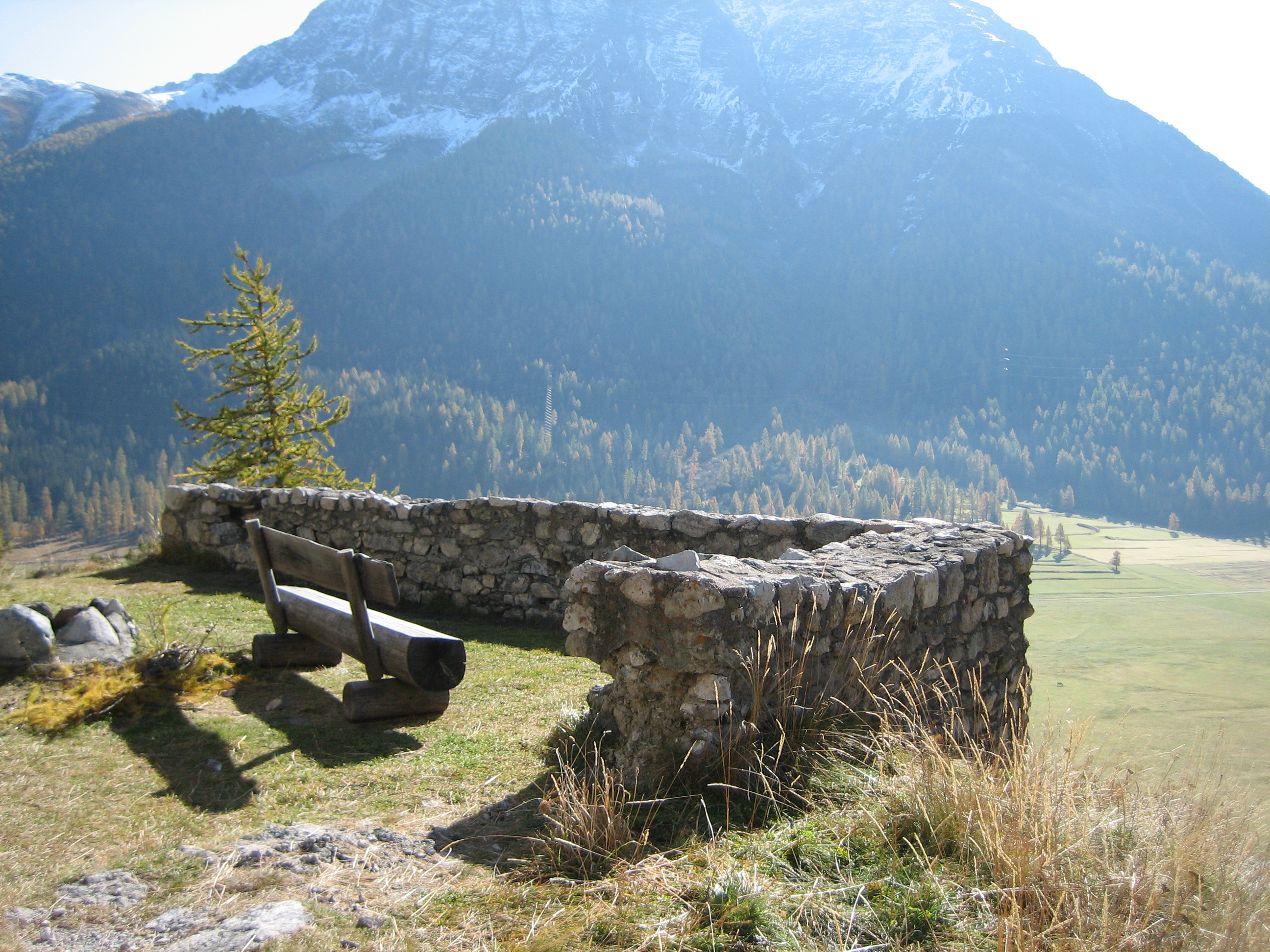
Looking toward the south-east

== See also ==
- List of castles in Switzerland
