= Madulain =

- Municipality
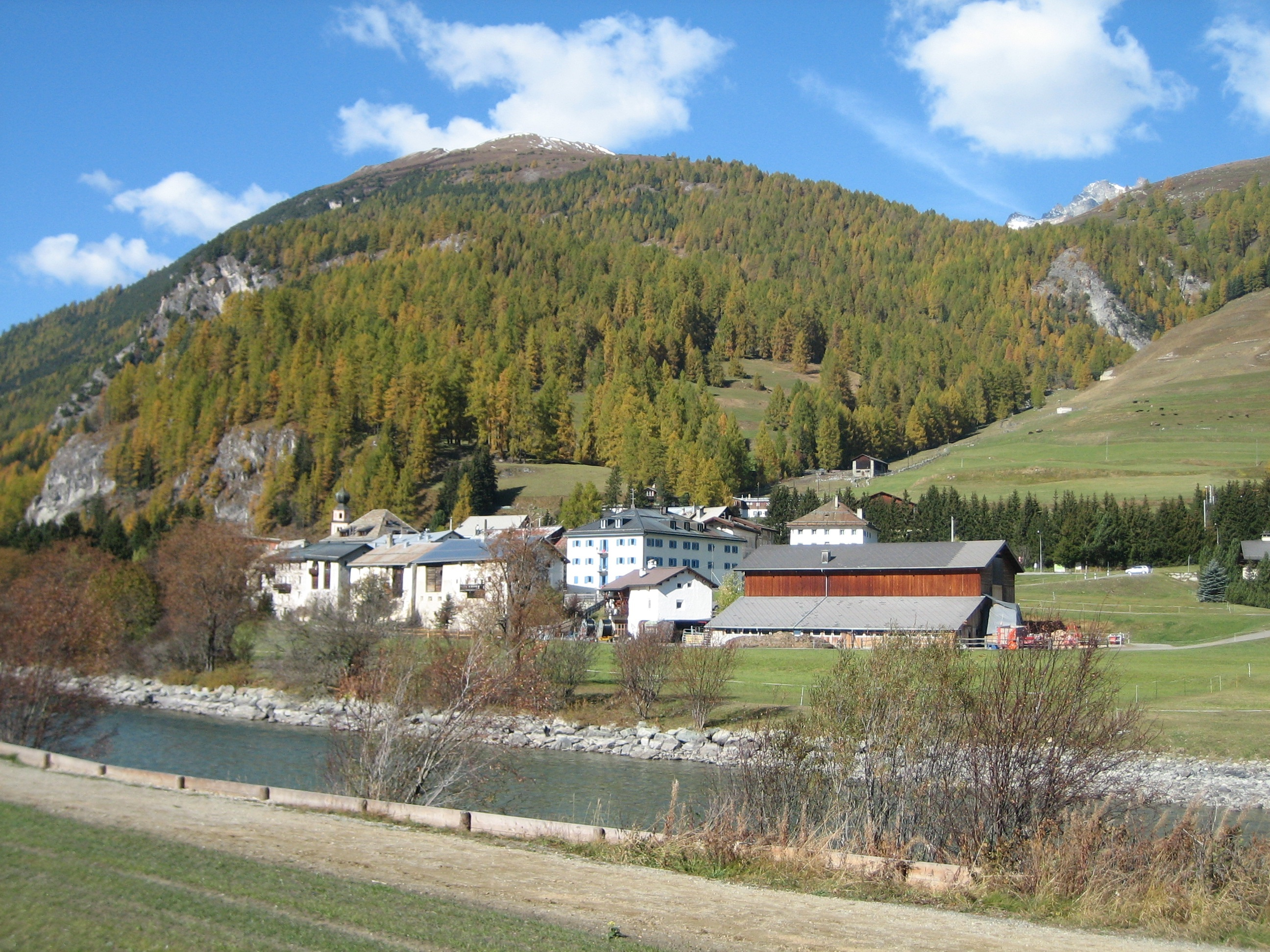

- Flag Coat of arms
- Location of Madulain
- Location within Switzerland Location within Canton of Grisons
- Coordinates: 46°35′N 9°56′E
- Country: Switzerland
- Canton: Grisons
- District: Maloja

Area
  - Total: 16.35 km^{2} (6.31 sq mi)
- Elevation: 1,697 m (5,568 ft)

Population (December 2015)
  - Total: 229
  - Density: 14.0/km^{2} (36.3/sq mi)
- Time zone: UTC+01:00 (CET)
  - Summer (DST): UTC+02:00 (CEST)
- Postal code: 7523
- SFOS number: 3783
- ISO 3166 code: CH-GR
- Surrounded by: Bever, La Punt Chamues-ch, Pontresina, S-chanf, Zuoz
- Website: www.madulain.ch

Madulain ([mɐduˈlaɪ̯n]) is a municipality in the Maloja Region in the Swiss canton of the Grisons.

== History ==
Madulain is first mentioned around 1137-39 as Madulene.

Guardaval Castle was built near the village of Madulain in the 13th century to administer the estates of the Bishop of Chur in the Upper Engadine. In 1409 the Bishop had to pledge the castle to the League of God's House to pay off some of his debts. Under the League, the castle was no longer an administrative center and was abandoned, falling into ruin.

== Geography ==
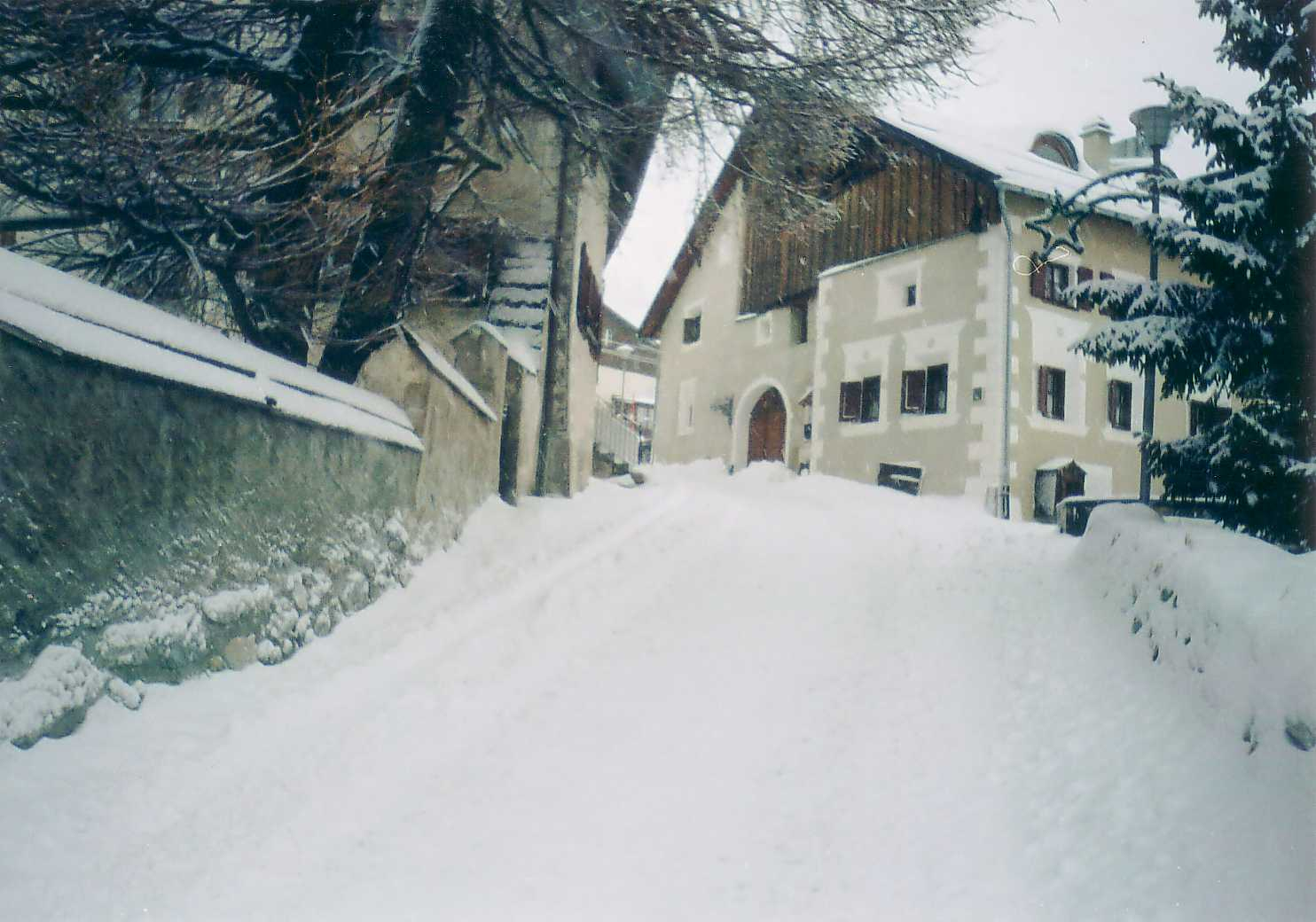
Madulain in the winter

Aerial view (1947)

Madulain has an area, (as of the 2004/09 survey) of 16.28 km^{2} (6.29 sq mi). Of this area, about 30.7% is used for agricultural purposes, while 14.5% is forested. Of the rest of the land, 2.6% is settled (buildings or roads) and 52.2% is unproductive land. In the 2004/09 survey a total of 13 ha (32 acres) or about 0.8% of the total area was covered with buildings, an increase of 6 ha (15 acres) over the 1985 amount. Over the same time period, the amount of recreational space in the municipality increased by 14 ha (35 acres) and is now about 0.98% of the total area. Of the agricultural land, 74 ha (180 acres) is fields and grasslands and 473 ha (1,170 acres) consists of alpine grazing areas. Since 1985 the amount of agricultural land has decreased by 45 ha (110 acres). Over the same time period the amount of forested land has increased by 9 ha (22 acres). Rivers and lakes cover 23 ha (57 acres) in the municipality.

Before 2017, the municipality was located in the Oberengadin sub-district of the Maloja district; after 2017 it was part of the Maloja Region. It is the smallest of the eleven municipalities in the district. It is located in the upper Engadin valley between La Punt Chamues-ch and Zuoz about 15 minutes from St. Moritz on the Inn River. It consists of the Haufendorf village (an irregular, unplanned and quite closely packed village, built around a central square) of Madulain on the Inn at an elevation of 1,684 m (5,525 ft). Until 1943 Madulain was known as Madulein.

== Demographics ==
Madulain has a population (as of December 2020) of 206. As of 2014, 32.3% of the population are resident foreign nationals. In 2015 a small minority was born in Italy (22 or 9.6% of the population), and Portugal (27 or 11.8% of the population). Over the previous 4 years (2010-2014) the population had changed at a rate of 19.59%. The birth rate in the municipality, in 2014, was 13.1, while the death rate was 13.1 per thousand residents.

As of 2014, children and teenagers (0–19 years old) make up 17.7% of the population, while adults (20–64 years old) are 65.5% of the population and seniors (over 64 years old) make up 16.8%. In 2015 there were 86 single residents, 116 people who were married or in a civil partnership, 8 widows or widowers and 19 divorced residents.

In 2014 there were 109 private households in Madulain with an average household size of 2.13 persons. Of the 94 inhabited buildings in the municipality, in 2000, about 34.0% were single family homes and 41.5% were multiple family buildings. Additionally, about 19.1% of the buildings were built before 1919, while 29.8% were built between 1991 and 2000. In 2013 there was no new construction in the municipality. The vacancy rate for the municipality, in 2015, was 0.94%.

The historical population is given in the following chart:

== Languages ==
Most of the population (as of 2000) speaks German (53.9%), with Romansh being second most common (22.2%) and Italian being third (17.2%). Currently, a minority of the population speaks the Upper-Engadin Romansh dialect of Puter, though until the early 19th Century the entire village spoke it. Due to increasing trade with the outside world, Romansh usage began to decline. In 1880, 68% named Romansh as their native language in the Swiss census, while in 1900 it was only 55% and by 1910 there were 36 native Romansh speakers and 47 native German speakers. However, during World War II the majority language switched several times. In 1941 the village was 50% Romansh speaking. By 1970 German was again the majority. In 1990, 27.5% named Romansh as their language of best command, with 50.8% naming it as a habitually spoken language, while in 2000 it was the language of best command for 22.2% and a habitually spoken language for 42.8%.

Languages in Madulain (1980: native language; 1990-2000: language of best command)
Languages	Census 1980		Census 1990		Census 2000	
Languages	Number	Percent	Number	Percent	Number	Percent
German	42	44.68%	48	40.00%	97	53.89%
Romansh	35	37.23%	33	27.50%	40	22.22%
Italian	15	15.96%	28	23.33%	31	17.22%
Population	94	100%	120	100%	180	100%

== Politics ==
In the 2015 federal election the most popular party was the SVP with 27.2% of the vote. The next three most popular parties were the SP (24.0%), the GLP (16.0%) and the FDP (14.7%). In the federal election, a total of 76 votes were cast, and the voter turnout was 55.9%. The 2015 election saw a large change in the voting when compared to 2011. The percentage of the vote received by the SVP increased sharply from 18.8% in 2011 to 27.2% in 2015

In the 2007 federal election the most popular party was the SVP which received 38.2% of the vote. The next three most popular parties were the SP (37%), the FDP (12.2%) and the CVP (10.2%).

== Education ==
In Madulain about 71.2% of the population (between age 25-64) have completed either non-mandatory upper secondary education or additional higher education (either university or a Fachhochschule).

== Economy ==
Madulain is classed as a semitourist community.

As of 2014, there were a total of 77 people employed in the municipality. Of these, a total of 15 people worked in 5 businesses in the primary economic sector. The secondary sector employed 9 workers in 4 separate businesses. Finally, the tertiary sector provided 53 jobs in 23 businesses.

In 2015 the average cantonal, municipal and church tax rate in the municipality for a couple with two children making SFr 80,000 was 3.3% and the rate for a single person making SFr 150,000 was 14.1%. The canton has an average tax rate for those making SFr 80,000 and an average rate for those making SFr 150,000. In 2013 the average income in the municipality per tax payer was SFr 51,954 and the per person average was SFr 44,630, which is less than the cantonal average of SFr 69,964 but greater than the per person amount of SFr 33,075. It is also less than the national per tax payer average of SFr 82,682 but greater than the per person average of SFr 35,825

== Transportation ==
The municipality has a railway station, Madulain, on the Bever–Scuol-Tarasp line. It has regular service to St. Moritz, Landquart, Scuol-Tarasp, and Pontresina.
