= Deposit bond =

Surety bond type

A deposit bond or deposit guarantee is a type of surety bond, a financial instrument commonly used in Australia for a security deposit as an alternative to cash. Deposit bonds facilitate residential and commercial real property purchases.

A buyer can use a deposit bond in the place of cash, by giving the seller a deposit bond at the time of purchase. The buyer and seller both must agree that the buyer will pay the seller the total sum for the property purchased at a future date; ownership of the property transfers from the seller to the buyer on this date.

Deposit bonds provide the seller assurance that the buyer's deposit is insured and that they will receive it in the case where the buyer fails to fulfill his or her obligation to the seller.

== History ==
Deposit bonds were introduced in Australia in 1988 by the UK multinational insurance group, Royal and Sun Alliance, through their Australian-owned company Deposit Power.

Banks and other insurance companies followed suit introducing the deposit bond into their product offerings, especially for their mortgage clients. Other financial intermediaries, such as brokers and financial advisers, have also become part of the supply chain of selling and issuing deposit bonds to the consumer. These financial intermediaries are typically authorized to act as agents for an insurance company or banks.

Deposit Bonds are available worldwide, under various names, such as down payment bonds in the united states

== Risk mitigation ==
Many banks and insurance companies have their own underwriting guidelines in relation to the issuance of Deposit Bonds that people will need to meet. The risk is borne by the issuer of the deposit bond, generally a financial institution or insurance company, on behalf of the buyer. If the buyer fails to fulfill their agreement, the seller is entitled to keep the security deposit which was held as collateral and in lieu of cash for the real estate purchase.

Therefore, upon a claim, the funds will be paid out immediately by the issuer of the bond to the seller.
