= Antichresis =

Antichresis, under civil law and Roman law, is a contract whereby a debtor pledges (i.e., conveys possession of but not title to) real property to a creditor, allowing the use and occupation of the pledged property, in lieu of interest on the loan.

Historically, antichresis was used in Ancient Mesopotamia (Akkad, Assyria, Babylonia) and by the Greeks and the Romans and it is still widely used in Bolivia. After the Western Church banned interest loans, it became a favored method of securing loans in early medieval society and was known in England as the gage of land (OFr gage, MLG sate, Germ Satzung). There were two variants: (1) the living gage (OFr vif gage, Germ Zinssatzung), under which the income and profits coming from the estate went towards reducing the loan's principal; and (2) the dead gage (OFr mort gage, MLG dotsate, Germ Totsatzung), under which the income and profits were taken only as interest. The latter form underlies the modern antichresis.

If the creditor is a debtor, he can sell the rights of antichresis to another creditor (Lat subpignus, Germ Unterpfand, It suppegno).

== See also ==
- Jeonse
- Mortgage law
- Pawn
