= Key money =

Form of tenant payment for leasing

Key money is one of several forms of payment made to a landlord. The term has various meanings in different parts of the world. It sometimes means money paid to an existing tenant who assigns a lease to a new tenant where the rent is below market. It sometimes means a bribe to a landlord. In other parts of the world, it is used synonymously with normal security deposits, which are used to cover nonpayment of rent and excessive damage to a rental unit.

== Oceania ==
=== Australia ===
In many states of Australia (New South Wales, Victoria, etc.), the Retail Leases Act calls key-money a payment or benefit without true consideration, expected from a tenant in order for a lease being granted, renewed or modified, and makes such payment illegal.

== Asia ==
=== Japan ===
In Japan, reikin (礼金; literally, "gratitude money") is a mandatory payment to the landlord that is often the same amount as the original deposit (shikikin). However, reikin can be the equivalent of six months (or more) of rent, but is typically the same as one to three months of rent. This money is considered a gift to the landlord and is not returned after the lease is canceled.

There are regional variations – in Kantō (Eastern Japan, including Tōkyō), a renewal fee (更新料, kōshinryō) is typically charged at contract renewal, similar to repetition of key money, while in Ōsaka key money is instead deducted from a large security deposit, which is known as shikibiki (敷引き), from "rental deposit" (敷金, shikikin).

In recent years, an increasing number of landlords and real estate agencies have begun to offer reikin-free rental housing, and the semipublic Urban Renaissance Agency does not charge key money or renewal fees.

=== South Korea ===
In South Korea, the key money system (as opposed to monthly rent or wolse) requires the lessee to make a deposit of about one-third to two-thirds the total cost of the leased property in lieu of monthly payment. The key money is returned when the lease expires. The key money deposit will not be returned before termination of the lease unless another lessee replaces the outgoing lessee.

=== Pakistan ===
It is goodwill and non-refundable. It is known as PAGHRI.

== Europe ==
=== France ===
In France, a tenant who has a lease that is below market can assign that lease to a new tenant. The new landlord is required to accept the original rent from the new tenant. The new tenant essentially buys the lease from the original tenant. The capitalization factor is financial and strategic, depending on cost of money, importance of the site to the taker and the location of the site. The ratio used goes from 0 (poor locations) to 12 (top locations). The remaining number of years of the contract has little or no impact unless it falls under the legal provision of déplafonnement du loyer, in which the landlord is automatically allowed to ask for a new, market-rate rent regardless of the rent paid so far.

=== Sweden ===
In Sweden, it is illegal for the landlord or an existing tenant to ask for compensation for an apartment lease, but a significant black market for rental contracts is believed to exist in some cities such as Stockholm. The Swedish Union of Tenants believes that the illegal practice of demanding key money or other compensation happens at most private landlord companies, while the landlords' advocacy group Fastighetsägarna believes that as much as half of the rental contracts are wrongly obtained at any time, and proposes a reduction of rent control as a solution. Merely paying key money is not a crime, but is considered by many to be a way of cheating (since you sidestep the queue system). It typically results in immediate termination of your lease if discovered.

However, it is legal to require a security deposit when renting out an apartment or house. It is rarely done when a commercial or public landlord is renting out an apartment to an individual, since it is easy for the landlord to get any debts collected. When individuals rent out to other individuals, or when businesses rent commercial premises, a security deposit of 1–6 months is usually requested.

=== Netherlands ===
In the Netherlands, key money (sleutelgeld) is a payment without consideration, often required by either the landlord or by the vacating tenant. The amount can vary from a symbolical amount up to one or more monthly lease terms. However, key money is deemed illegal and repayment can be enforced by legal means. As the Netherlands experience a shortage in living space (especially in Amsterdam and other large cities in the west), landlords and tenants nevertheless often ask for key money despite it being illegal.

== North America ==
=== United States ===
In the United States, it is common to require key money in the form of a security deposit. The tenant pays one or two months' rent up-front. These funds are then held in escrow and are used to offset delinquent payments or damage to the property. If neither happens, the money is refunded (typically with statutory interest) when the tenant vacates. It is illegal but common for unscrupulous landlords to refuse to refund some or all of this deposit, instead keeping it for unneeded "cleaning" or "repairs". Landlord-tenant laws in the United States typically specify that a landlord must provide a detailed accounting of all deductions from a security deposit on request and normally cannot charge for "normal wear and tear", such as replacing old carpets or painting walls that have not been painted for many years.

Generally in the United States, apartment leases are not transferable without the consent of the landlord. The primary exception is the right to rent a space in a mobile home park, which is frequently transferable, frequently rent-controlled, and frequently subject to French-style "key money" payments to the original tenant in the form of buying the current mobile home at an inflated price. The new tenant can then junk the existing, outdated trailer and replace it with a modern one while keeping the terms of the original lease for the land under it.

When renting commercial properties in which the premises already contains various trade-fixtures, equipment, electric, and plumbing (items typically left when a former tenant vacates), such items have a value above the typical rent for an empty "vanilla shell" premises. The landlord would charge the tenant key money in order for the tenant to have the right to use and take over all of the existing equipment.

=== Mexico ===
In Mexico, key money is referred to as "guante" (translating to "glove" in English).

== Covert key money ==
Since key money is in many cases illegal for the reason that it is a payment without consideration or even a bribe, it is often disguised as other costs:

- Made-up additional charges for 'cleaning', 'contract drafting', 'administration', 'registration', etc.
- An obligation for the tenant to take over furniture or other items from the landlord or vacating tenant, for an amount which does not reflect the true economic value of these items.
- Demanding large security deposits which are only repayable at face value (thus without interest). Unscrupulous landlords could even as a matter of principle not return any security deposits at all.

== See also ==
- Damage deposit
- Jeonse
- Rental agreement
- Security deposit
