= Jorge Bocobo =

Filipino author and jurist

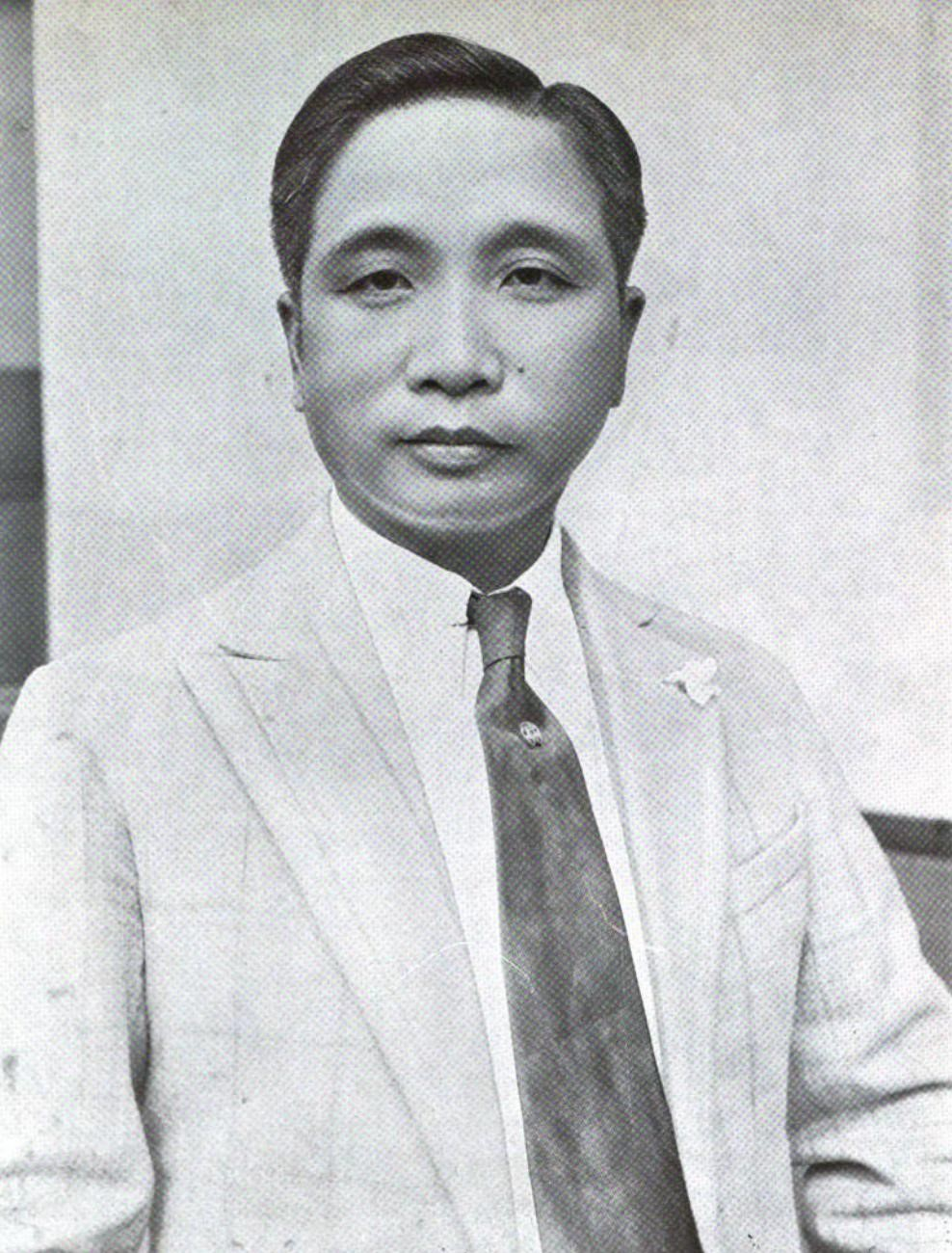
- Photograph from The Commercial & Industrial Manual of the Philippines, 1941

39th Associate Justice of the Supreme Court of the Philippines
- In office February 5, 1942 – January 31, 1944
- Appointed by: Masaharu Homma
- Succeeded by: Court reorganized

16th Secretary of Public Instruction
- In office April 19, 1939 – December 24, 1941
- President: Manuel L. Quezon
- Preceded by: Manuel L. Quezon
- Succeeded by: Sergio Osmeña

5th President of the University of the Philippines
- In office 1934–1939
- Preceded by: Rafael Palma
- Succeeded by: Bienvenido Ma. Gonzalez

Personal details
- Born: October 19, 1886 Gerona, Tarlac, Captaincy General of the Philippines
- Died: July 23, 1965 (aged 78) Manila, Philippines
- Resting place: Manila Memorial Park – Sucat, Parañaque, Philippines
- Spouse: Felicia de Castro
- Children: 7
- Education: Indiana University School of Law (LLB)
- Occupation: Author, jurist

Jorge Cleofas Bocobo (October 19, 1886 – July 23, 1965) was a Filipino author and jurist. He was appointed Secretary of Public Instruction by President Manuel L. Quezon and Justice of the Supreme Court from 1942 to 1944 under President Jose P. Laurel. Bocobo was the principal author of the Civil Code of the Philippines.

== Early life and education ==
Bocobo was born in October 19, 1886, in Gerona, Tarlac, to Tranquilino Bocobo y Duenas and Rita Teodora Tabago y Cleofas. He studied his early education in his hometown until at the age of 17, he went to Manila and attended a private school there. He was chosen as one of the 100 Philippine students for the Pensionado program, which sent exceptional Filipino students to attend a U.S. college. This enabled Bacobo to attend Indiana University School of Law. In June 1907, he received his Bachelor of Laws (LL.B.).

== Career ==
=== University of the Philippines ===
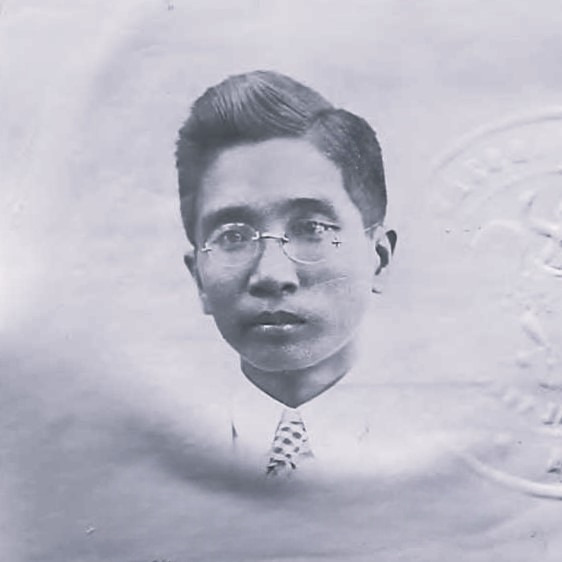
Bocobo in 1918

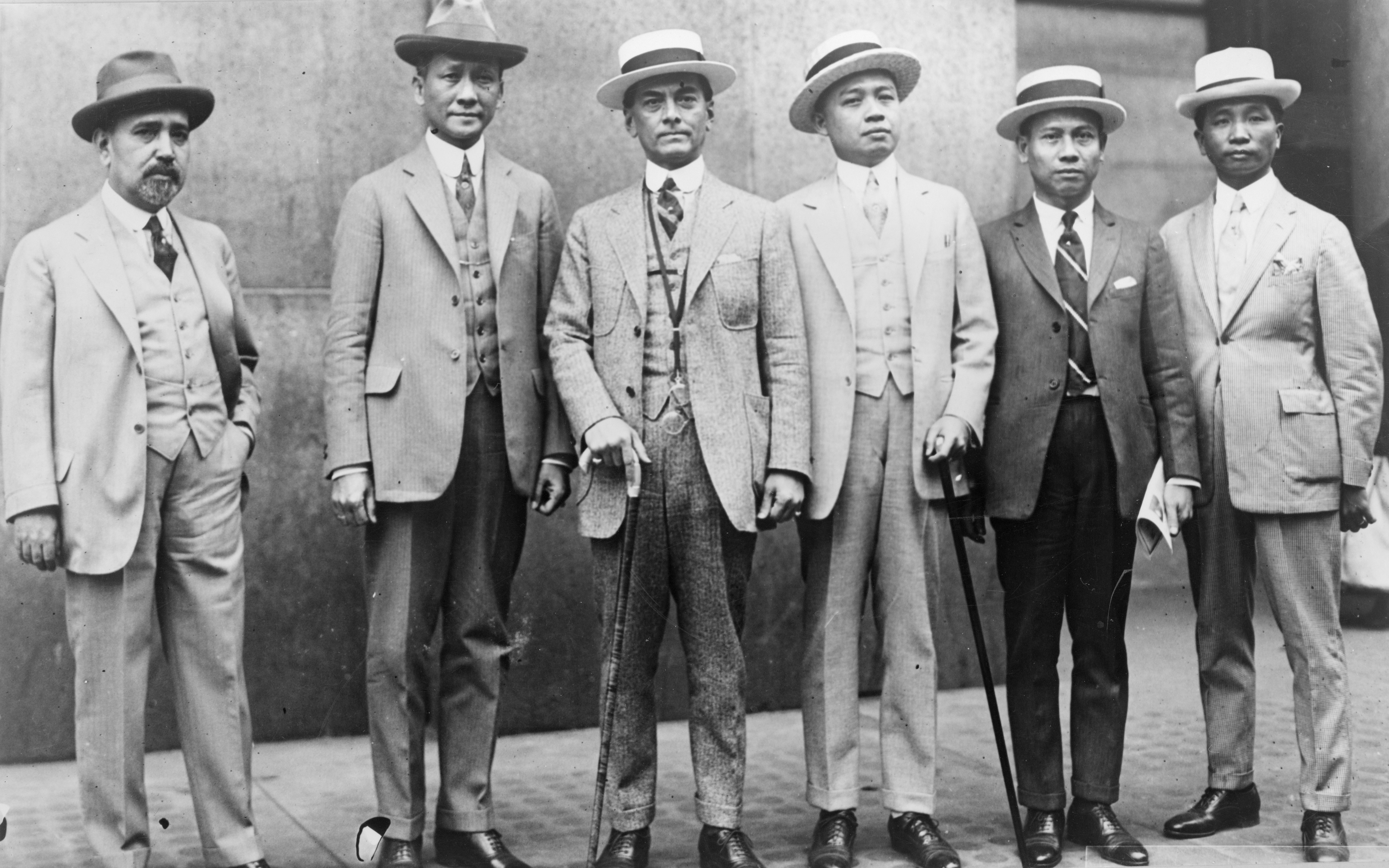
Bocobo (last person on the right) along with representatives of the Philippine Independence Mission, 1924

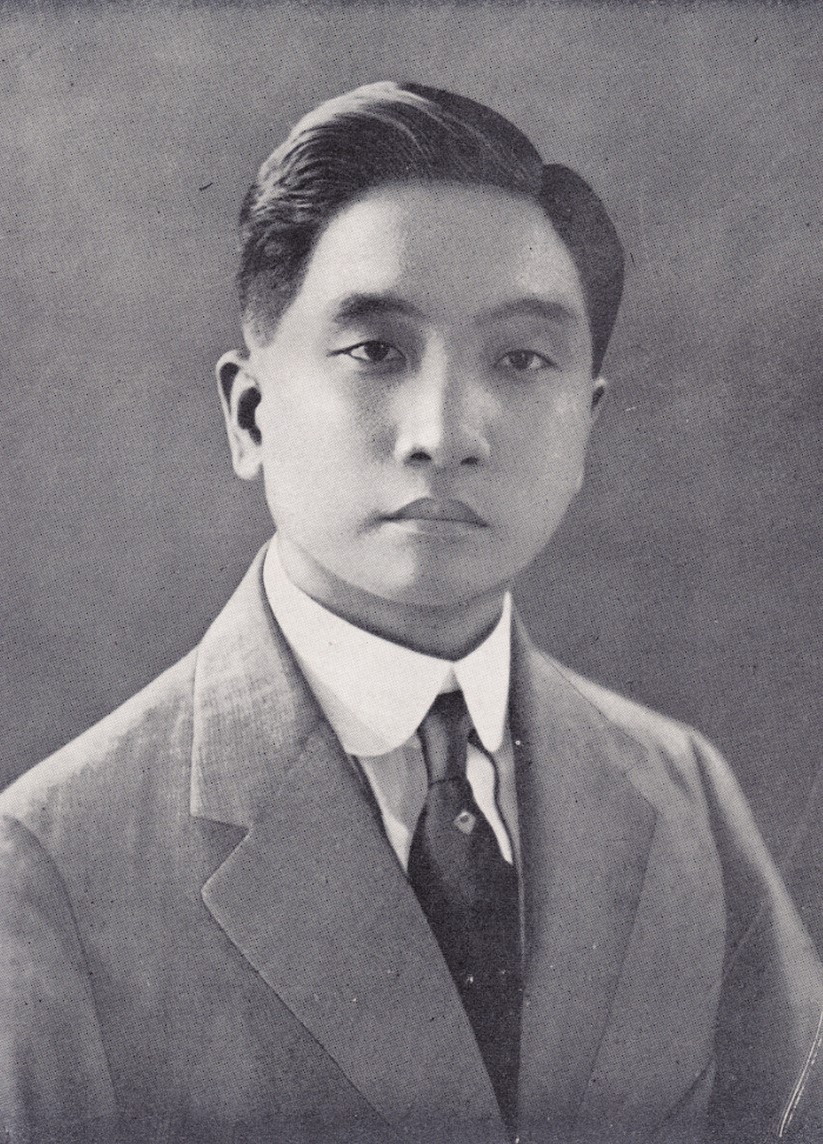
Bocobo in 1933

Bocobo returned to the Philippines. In 1910, he became a member of the faculty of the College of Law at the University of the Philippines. He then became Assistant Professor of Civil Law in 1914 and subsequently a Full Professor in 1917. He also became the Dean of the College of Law from 1917 to 1934. He was also member of the Philippine independence commissions to the United States in 1919, 1922, 1923, and 1924.

In 1927 and 1928, he was acting president of the university. He served president of the university in 1934 until 1939.

==== As a writer ====
During the 1910s, Bocobo was a writer of short stories for the Filipino publication, The Philippine Review. He also translated Rizal's preface of Ferdinand Blumentritt's book, Filipinas, into English.

As a writer himself, Bocobo criticized Jose Garcia Villa's poems as too "indecent and obscene". Being dean at the University of the Philippines, he suspended the sophomore in the College of Law for a year.

==== Filipinism (filipinismo) movement ====
Filipino intellectuals, like Bocobo, expressed worries about losing the Philippines' cultural identity due to American influence. Bocobo emphasized the importance of preserving the "Filipino Soul" or "filipinismo" and distinct national character. He warned that: "The violent winds of custom that flow from across the Pacific are beginning to rock the edifice of Filipino virtues. The sound and stout qualities of the Filipino race are in danger."

As an educator, Bocobo promoted the revival of Filipino folk dances. He also pushed for more Filipino-centric materials. He, as president of the university, initiated research on music and dances across various ethnic communities and assigned university faculty, including Francisca Reyes, to survey Philippine folk dances in 1934.

=== Government service ===
Bocobo was appointed as Secretary of Public Instruction in 1939 by President Manuel L. Quezon. He served until 1941. During the Japanese occupation, he served as Justice of the Supreme Court under the administration of President Jose P. Laurel. Due to this, he was charged with treason by the Americans.

When the Americans occupied Manila in 1945, Bocobo was detained as a political prisoner for ten months and then freed for lack of sufficient evidence. After the war, he achieved monumental success. He became chairman and chief contributor of the Code Commission which produced the Civil Code of the Philippines. It was approved by the Philippine Congress in 1949. He served chairman of the commission from 1947 until 1962.

==== 1955 Land Reform Act ====
Bocobo defended the need for land reform during the administration of President Ramon Magsaysay. He was one of the staunch defenders of Magsaysay's 1955 Land Reform Bill to be passed in Philippine Congress. However, there were opposition for the bill. In a debate between Bocobo and president of The National Rice Planters Association (NPRA), Manuel N. Gallego, Gallego asked the Code Commissioner whether it is actually the inequality of land causing the peasant farmer rebellion in Central Luzon. Gallego further belittled the rebellion deeming that the farmers were inspired by communist propaganda.

== Awards and recognition ==
- Honorary doctorate degree from the University of Southern California (1931)
- Presidential Award of Merit (1949) given by President Elpidio Quirino
- Honorary doctorate degree from the Indiana University (1951)
- Honorary doctorate degree from the University of the Philippines (1953)

== Selected publications ==
- Bocobo, Jorge Cleofas (1951). El nuevo codigo civil Filipino. Guillermo B. Guevara papers. Madrid: Instituto Editorial Reus.
- Bocobo, Jorge Cleofas (1951). Furrows and arrows, poetry and verse. Manila: M. Colcol.
- Bocobo, Jorge Cleofas (1933). For freedom and dignity the Hawes-Cutting Bill denounced by the author in a debate with Dean Maximo M. Kalaw. Manila: Oriental Print.
- Bocobo, Jorge Cleofas (1937–1938). "The Cult of Legalism". Philippine Law Journal. 17: 253.
