= Urban Renaissance Agency =

- 独立行政法人都市再生機構

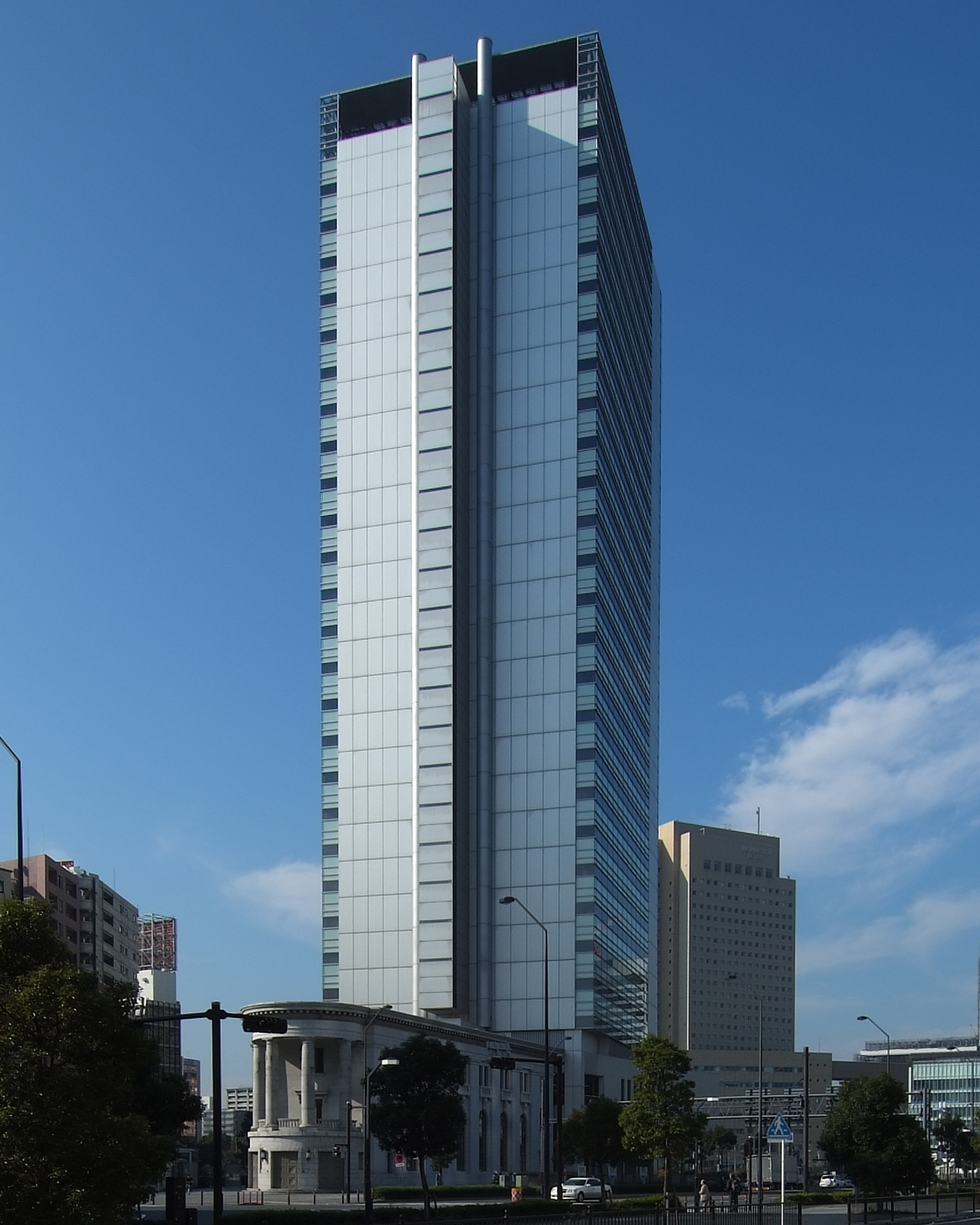
- Abbreviation: UR
- Nickname: 都市機構
- Predecessor: 都市基盤整備公団 地域振興整備公団の地方都市開発整備部門
- Established: July 1, 2004; 21 years ago
- Type: Independent Administrative Institution
- Location: Yokohama, Japan
- Coordinates: 35°27′0.5″N 139°38′6.4″E
- Leader: Masaru Ishida
- Parent organization: Ministry of Land, Infrastructure, Transport and Tourism
- Funding: ¥ 1,057 billion
- Staff: 3,196
- Website: www.ur-net.go.jp

Urban Renaissance Agency (独立行政法人都市再生機構, Dokuritsu gyōsei hōjin Toshi saisei kikō), also known as UR (都市機構, UR都市機構), is a semipublic Independent Administrative Institution, and is an agency responsible for Japanese housing. It provides housing at rates pegged to the market, but without the fees associated with private renting in Japan (key money, renewal fee) or the need for a guarantor. As of 2014, it managed around 750,000 rental properties across Japan.

== History ==
It was founded in 1955 as the Japan Housing Corporation (Nihon Jūtaku Kōdan) to address the country's housing shortage due to post-war urbanisation. It was combined with other government organisations including the Japan Regional Development Corporation and semi-privatized in 2004 during the administration of Prime Minister Junichiro Koizumi (2001–06). The agency gave rise to the development of Danchi housing found in urban areas of post-war Japan.

== Residents ==
According to the Ministry of Land, Infrastructure, Transport and Tourism, public housing in Japan has priority admission, particularly those in need of stable housing, such as:

1. Elderly households
2. Households with disabilities
3. Households with significantly low income
4. Households raising children (including single-mother and single-father households, households with small children, and those with a high degree of housing distress)
5. Young couples
6. Households of victims of domestic violence
7. Households that have become unable to reside in their previous homes due to crime
8. Households of Japanese descendants remaining in China, etc.
