= Jeonse =

Type of a lease or deposit in South Korean real estate

- Hangul: 전세
- Hanja: 傳貰
- RR: jeonse
- MR: chŏnse
- IPA: [tɕʌn.sʰe]

Jeonse (English: /ˈtʃʌnseɪ/ CHUN-say; Korean: 전세), also known as chŏnse, key money deposit or key money, is a type of lease or deposit common in the South Korean real estate market. Instead of paying monthly rent, a renter will make a lump-sum deposit on a rental space, at anywhere from 50% to 80% of the market value, which is then returned at the end of the lease term. The owners make profit from reinvesting the jeonse deposit, instead of receiving the monthly rent. It is also possible to combine a lower jeonse deposit with a small monthly rent; this is known as banjeonse (반전세; 半傳貰; lit. 'half-jeonse').

== Operation ==
Jeonse involves the tenant giving the landlord a large sum of "key money" when a lease is signed. The amount of money required depends on the economy and the location of the property. Usually, the amount required is 50% of the property's value, but it can be as high as 60–80%. In 2014, it was reported that the average cost of a jeonse in Seoul equals almost $300,000 USD. The tenant is then allowed to stay in the property "rent-free", not requiring any additional monthly payments, until the end of the lease, which is usually 2 years. Utilities and other costs (water, gas, electricity, cable, phone, internet, security) are applied for and paid by the tenant.

This system is popular with both consumers and landlords. First, there are very few mortgages in South Korea, so it is difficult for consumers to own a home. Also, real estate prices continue to increase so fast that some see the situation as a housing bubble. The landlord makes a return by taking the deposit money, investing it, and keeping all interest earned on the deposit. The tenant's deposit is protected by having a lien issued against the property for the amount given. The entire deposit is then returned to the tenant at the end of the lease. The landlord can treat the deposit as a 0% interest rate loan to invest into other capital, which made jeonse especially desirable in the 20th century when interest rates were very high.

During times of lower interest rates, wolse (월세; 月貰), or monthly rent, is more often used. With a wolse lease, a renter signs a lease for 1 or 2 years and makes a deposit on the apartment equal to perhaps 10% of the market value. The renter then pays the monthly rent. In rare cases where damage has been done to the property, the damage has to be fixed to the landlord's standard before the landlord will return the deposit.

== History ==
=== Origin ===
The jeonse system has origins tracing back over a century in Korea, some claim the arrangement began in the 19th century, spurred on by a treaty with Japan, but it became more popular and what it's known as today in the late 20th century, particularly in the 1960s and 1970s. The system was seen as a solution to a shortage of mortgages, spurred on by high-interest rates, which dampens economic activity. This situation was compounded by the rapid urbanization and rural flight occurring, increasing the demand for urban housing. Jeonse facilitated economic development without traditional lending means, enabling urban growth.

=== Contemporary ===
The 20th-century era of high-interest rates and a shortage of mortgages is receding. South Korean interest rates for over a decade have remained low, at or under 3 percent. This has made the system less integral and beneficial to property developers than it once was, and has encouraged the increase in popularity of renting via wolse, rather than deposits. The newfound low interest rates have somewhat reversed the dynamic of jeonse, with now many tenants taking out loans for the deposit rather than savings, the interest on the loans each month can often be less than market-rate rent. However, this also means that rate hikes hurt jeonse, rather than help it as it originally did, since now it's the tenants who are borrowing money and therefore benefit from low rates.

==== Policy changes ====
The government has made active efforts to attempt to shift the housing market away from jeonse and towards wolse, increasing tax benefits to renters, such as tax credits, and removing some financial support from those who still opt for jeonse. In April 2022, monthly wolse contracts surpassed jeonse contracts for the first time, with renting at 50.4% and jeonse at 49.6%. Recent decreases in jeonse market share are due to increasing interest rates during COVID-19 recovery, and government policy.

== Risks ==
As jeonse tenants are not obligated to pay any monthly rent, it may lead them to believe that jeonse is a great deal in all aspects. However, there is a certain level of risks of which the tenants shall be aware for leasing an apartment by jeonse.

=== Rising housing market ===
Jeonse tenants are taking a financial short position in the housing market. When the apartment price goes down the amount of jeonse deposit goes down proportionally, although this may not always be the case. In such circumstances, the tenants will get the difference back when they renew the lease, at least in theory. However, if their landlords fail to provide the difference either with their own money or by taking a loan, the tenants are left with a few difficult options such as a lawsuit. On the other hand, when the apartment price goes up the deposit may go up as well, and the tenants shall fill the gap when they renew the lease.

During times of expansion in the housing market, or in cases of excess demand, there can be large hikes in the percentage of the property's value that the tenant must pay. This has been characterized as a crisis in the past, namely in the 1990s, where over a dozen people were driven to suicide in the face of these increases in deposit prices. Such extreme cases have been fixed in the past by large increases in the supply of housing.

=== Variable interest rates ===
It is a common practice that jeonse tenants have the deposit ready by taking a loan from a bank due to the sheer amount of the deposit. If they take a loan with a variable annual percentage rate (APR), which is fairly common, they are exposed to the risk of rising interest rates. However, banks can provide a very low APR (2-4%) as the deposit may be taken as collateral.

According to the latest report by the Bank of Korea, the bank's household loan balance as of the end of December 2020 was 98.8 trillion won. Compared to the end of December 2019, there is an increase of 10 trillion won, the largest since 2004.

=== Dishonest landlords ===
Some landlords may have a large amount of overdue taxes. In such cases, the government may put the apartment up for auction in an attempt to collect the overdue taxes. When the apartment is sold, the government collects the overdue profits from the auction. Since national tax (국세) and local tax (지방세) take a higher priority than the tenants, they may lose some or all of their deposit, depending on how much their landlords owe the government.

== See also ==
- Antichresis, (Anticrético in Spanish), a system common in Bolivia, due to limited access to credit.
- Key money
- Mortgage loan
- Rahn (Iran) – similar system in the Iranian real estate market
