= Gage (finance) =

Pledge of real property in medieval times as collateral for a loan

In medieval finance, a gage or gage of land was a usufructory pledge of real property. The gage came in two forms:

- the dead gage (Scots deid wad, French mort-gage, German Totsatzung); or
- the living gage (Welsh prid, Fr vif-gage, G Zinssatzung).

When a feudal tenant or landlord needed liquid resources, they could pledge their estate in land, as collateral, for a money loan. Since the gaged collateral was typically a piece of real property which generated revenue (e.g. a farm which produced crops, a mill which processed food, a pasture that provided milk or wool, etc.), the lender-gagee received the rents and profits of the land. Under the terms of a living gage, these rents and profits reduced the amount the borrower-gagor owed, while under a dead gage they did not. This meant that if the property was prosperous enough, or the loan small enough, a property in living gage could pay off the debt itself; in other words, it was self-redeeming. On the other hand, with a dead gage, the property's rents and profits did not go toward satisfying the principal, but instead constituted interest on the loan, which made it a form of usury. As a result, dead gages were denounced as immoral/illegal among Catholic theologians.
