= Danchi =

Large cluster of apartment buildings or houses of a particular style in Japan

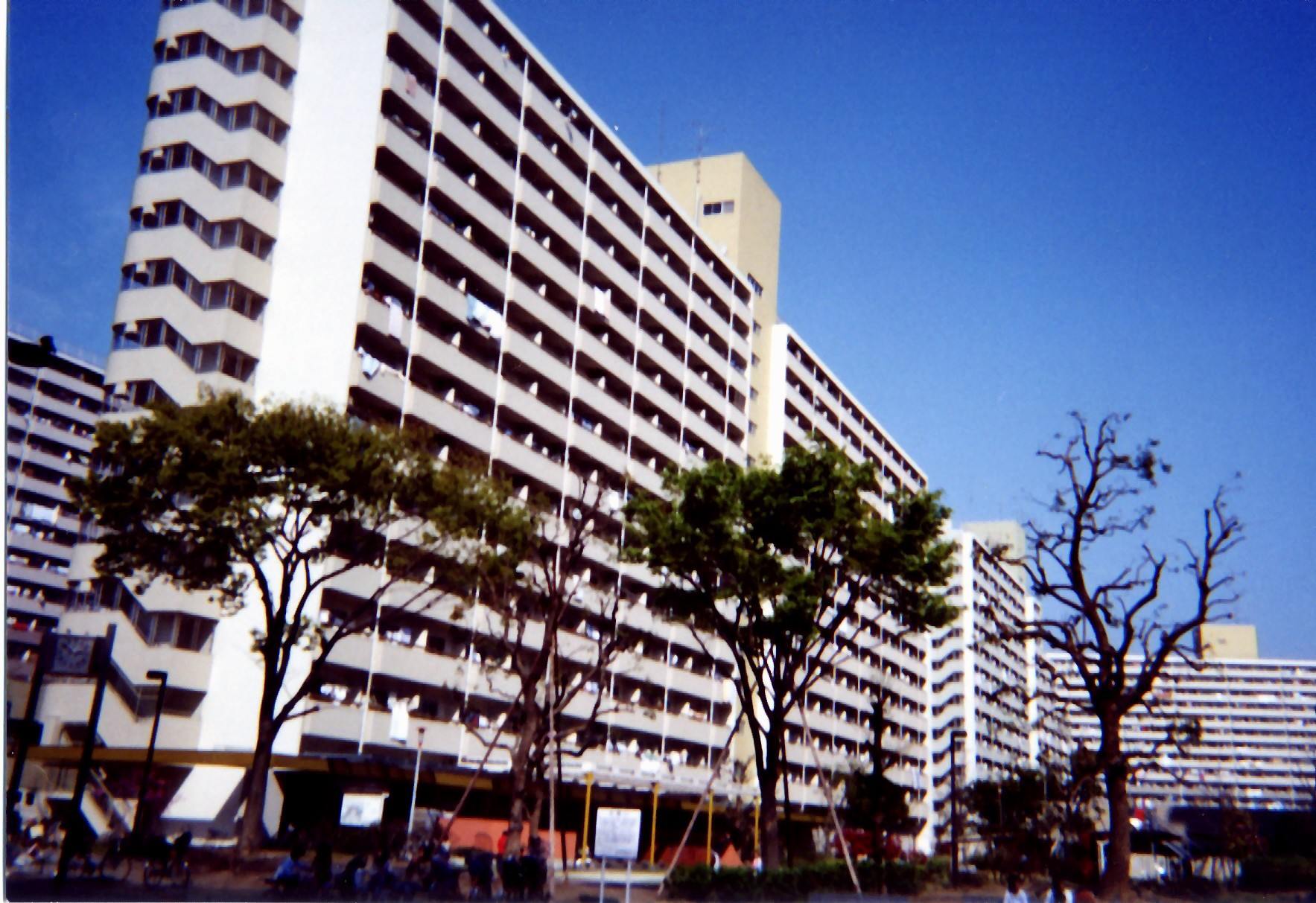
Takashimadaira Danchi in Itabashi, Tokyo

Danchi (Japanese: 団地, literally "group land") is the Japanese word for a large cluster of apartment buildings or houses of a particular style and design, typically built as public housing by government authorities. Older danchi are sometimes compared to Khrushchyovkas, a similar housing development project in the Soviet Union from the same period. The Japan Housing Corporation (JHC), now known as the Urban Renaissance Agency (UR), was founded in 1955. During the 1950s, 1960s, and 1970s, the JHC built many danchi in suburban areas to offset the increasing housing demand during the post-World War II economic boom. It introduced the Japanese salaryman to a life around the nuclear family in contrast with the multi-generation homes before the war. The kitchen embodied the raised status of the Japanese housewife, as it was in the center of the apartment, not in a dark corner. The families equipped them with the "Three Sacred Treasures": a refrigerator, a washing machine and a black and white television set. The typical layout of a danchi unit is a "2DK" format with a dining-kitchen area and two bedrooms.

The rent payment for a danchi is much cheaper than that of a condominium or a mortgage, but for a public danchi the prospective tenant must usually participate in a lottery to be assigned an open apartment. Some danchi built in recent years are quite modern and spacious, but since there is a lottery for assignment, the waiting list can often run years. On the other hand, there continue to be many open slots in older, distant danchi. Originally, the monthly wage of the renter had to be at least 5.5 times the rent.

Residents in UR danchi do not have to pay key money or contract renewal fees, making the residences cheaper than comparable housing even if the monthly rents are equivalent. Some danchi are owned by large corporations, who charge low or no rent to employees as a benefit as well as to encourage them to live alongside their colleagues to foster a corporate "family" atmosphere.

== Issues ==
=== Aging population ===
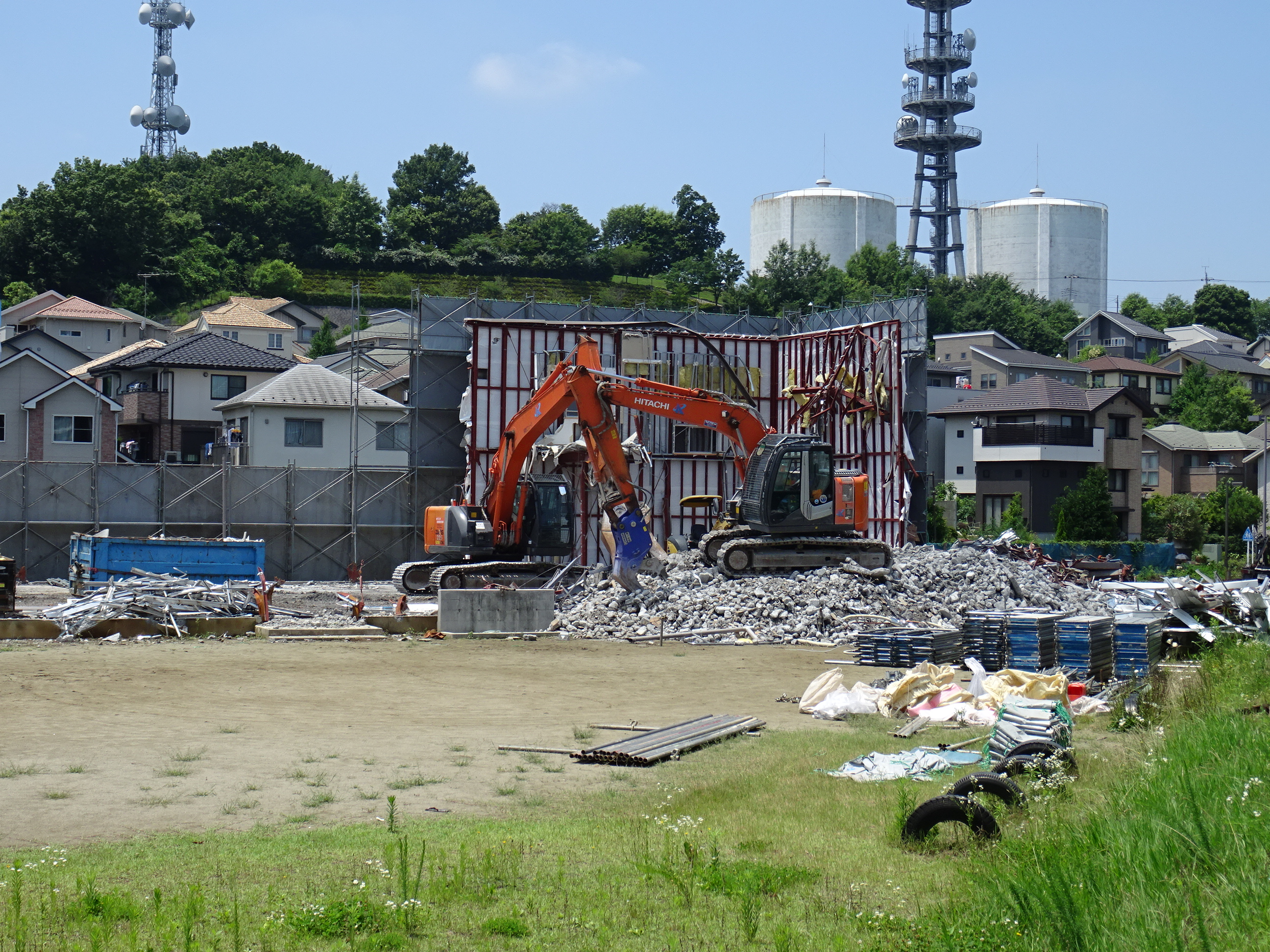
School being demolished in Tama New Town, Tokyo, due to declining enrollment

Today, fewer and fewer Japanese live in the rapidly aging danchi, preferring detached houses or condominiums, known as mansion (マンション, manshon).

Due to the mass influx of young families into danchi in a short period of time from the 1950s through 1970s, age groups of danchi neighbourhoods are much more uniform compared to other neighbourhoods in Japan. Since the 2000s, it became a major social issue in Japan due to its rapidly aging population with a majority of the population being pensioners with their dependents living elsewhere. The rapidly aging population have caused nearby stores, public facilities and schools to close, further keeping young families from moving into danchi neighbourhoods.

Many of the new residents after the 1990s are childless couples or elderly singles. Seniors living in danchi often face isolation and are susceptible to kodokushi, a phenomenon of dying alone and not being discovered. Men living alone are especially vulnerable. Some danchi have attracted young immigrants and foreign worker families from outside of Japan, gradually lowering the average age of the population, although the seniors still face isolation.

=== Aging buildings ===
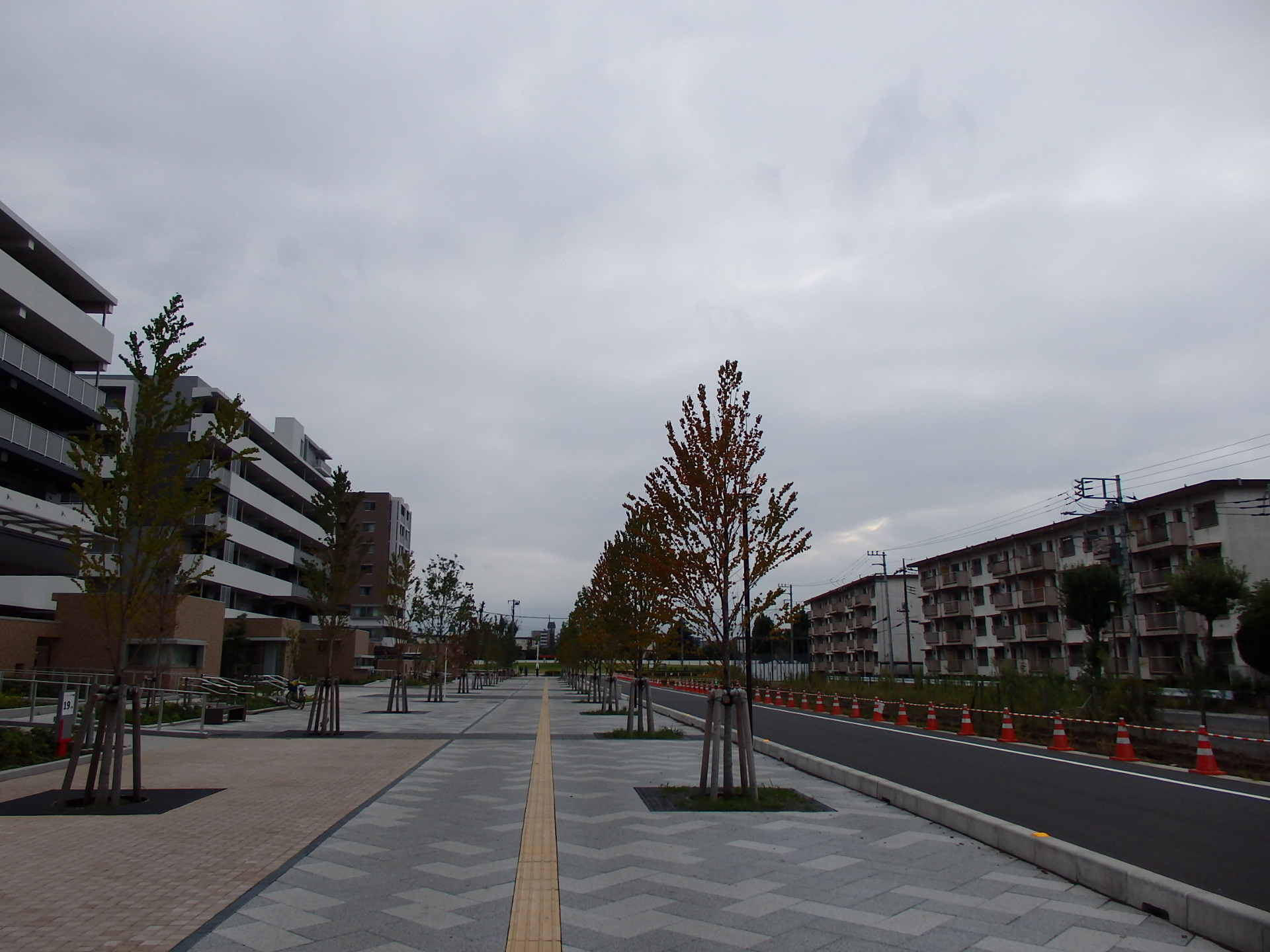
Danchi buildings built in the 1960s (right), situated across a street from modern apartment blocks built in the 2000s (left)

Many danchi were built in the 1950s through 1970s with building codes and seismic standards of that time. Buildings from those periods are considered outdated and often have various accessibility issues. While most danchi have gone through seismic retrofit to meet the current seismic standards, many danchi are being demolished and rebuilt since the 2000s to modernize and bring the buildings up to current codes, improve accessibility and to attract younger families.

=== Public perception ===
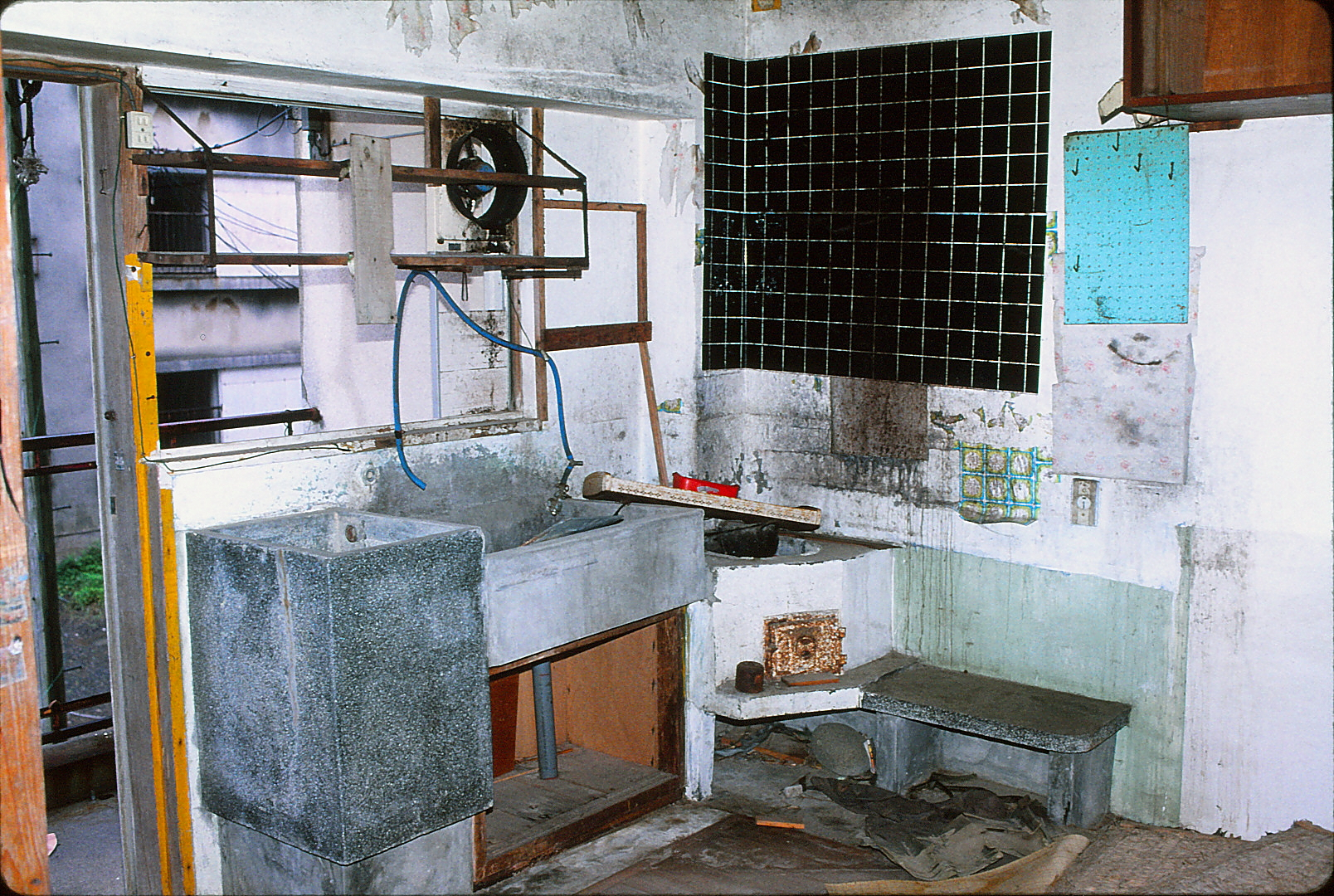
Early danchi interior photographed in 1992. Negative issues with early danchi have led to the term falling out of favor.

Although the name danchi evoked the image of modern housing at the time they were built in the 1960s, today the name is associated with poverty, aging population and outdated post-war buildings offering minimum amenities to their occupants.

Modern "danchi" built in recent years are no longer branded as a danchi due to the negative image of this name.

== Regeneration ==
The UR is currently implementing renovations in certain danchis through unit refurbishments, and starting community engagement programs. There is a large motivation to cater towards a young, incoming population. Other programs that are being administered are DIY workshops where residents learn how to repair a danchi apartment. Additionally, in an UR meeting, regeneration policies were established such as administering bases for activities for residents.

== See also ==
- Housing in Japan
- Public housing in Singapore
- Housing estate
- Tower blocks, similar public housing projects in the United Kingdom
- The Million Programme in Sweden
- Panelák
