= Tenancy deposit scheme (England and Wales) =

Deposit protection

Under the provisions of the United Kingdom Housing Act 2004 every landlord or letting agent that takes a deposit for an assured shorthold tenancy in England and Wales must protect the deposit under an authorised tenancy deposit scheme. The regulations came into effect on 6 April 2007, and were amended by the Localism Act 2011 (taking effect from 6 April 2012) and the Deregulation Act 2015 (taking effect from 26 March 2015). Most recently the Tenant Fees Act 2019 provided further protections for tenants (e.g. restricting the maximum deposit that can be taken and banning automatic cleaning fees regardless of how clean the property was returned).

== Reasons for introduction ==
It is common for landlords to take a dilapidation deposit from a tenant at the start of the tenancy. The deposit acts as a safeguard should the tenant cause any damage to the property. Some unscrupulous landlords are either very slow to return deposits at the end of the tenancy or make unfair deductions. The purpose of the regulations is to ensure good practice in this area, and try to keep disputes between landlords and tenants out of the courts by encouraging alternative dispute resolution. However, tenants and landlords still need to be ready to escalate matters to the deposit protection scheme after the tenancy has ended if agreement is not reached quickly, otherwise waiting too long can mean they lose access to the scheme's impartial adjudication service.

== Description ==
The tenant pays over the deposit (commonly one month's rent) in the usual way when the tenancy agreement is signed. The landlord or letting agency has 30 days from receipt of the deposit to provide the tenant with details of the scheme that they are using (known as the prescribed information). If there is no dispute at the end of the tenancy the deposit will be returned to the two parties as agreed. If a dispute has arisen then the parties will be invited to make use of the alternative dispute resolution process that is provided free within the scheme. Should the parties opt for alternative dispute resolution they will be bound by its decision, but can only appeal to the county court to overturn the decision.

There are two types of protection scheme:

– Custodial-based

– Insurance-based

In England & Wales there are three companies providing these schemes:

- The Tenancy Deposit Scheme (TDS)
- My Deposits
- Deposit Protection Service (DPS)

The Custodial schemes are free to use and the landlord or letting agents can simply pay the deposit online or over the phone. The money is held in a bank account by the Scheme and transferred directly to the tenant once both parties agree on the total sum of money to release.

When the deposit is under an insurance-based scheme, the landlord or the letting agent will hold the deposit but have to pay a fee to ensure the landlord will not illegally retain the deposit at the end of the tenancy. If at the end of the tenancy the landlord does not release the deposit, the insurance will pay back the tenant.

Initially, the DPS offered only a custodial scheme while TDS and MyDeposits offered only an insurance-backed scheme. From April 2013, the DPS also offered an insurance-backed scheme, and from April 2016, the TDS and MyDeposits both started offering a custodial scheme. Between April and September 2013, Capita also operated an insurance-backed scheme. Deposit protected by Capita was subsequently transferred to MyDeposits.

== Enforcement ==
If a landlord or letting agent does not both protect a tenant's depositt and provide the tenant with the prescribed information within 30 days then they are prevented from regaining possession of the property under a Section 21 notice under the Housing Act 1988, unless the deposit is first repaid or proceedings for a penalty against the landlord, or its agent, has been initiated and settled.

If the tenant applies to court for the deposit to be protected and it is shown the landlord is not compliant with the scheme, then the court must order the landlord to pay the tenant between one and three times the deposit amount within 14 days.

Non-protection of a deposit taken before the commencement of the regulations on 6 April 2007 does not result in a penalty, but no valid Section 21 notice may be served until the deposit has been protected.

=== Pre-2012 cases ===
- Tiensia v Vision Enterprises Ltd - deposit registered after 14-day deadline
- Gladehurst Properties Ltd v Hashemi - deposit never registered during tenancy
- Draycott v Hannels - deposit registered after 14-day deadline
- Harvey v Bamforth - deposit registered within 14 days but information not provided

The defences in these cases are affected by the Localism Act 2011, which made the following changes to the law affecting deposit registration:

- Deadline for registration and providing prescribed information changed from 14 to 30 days following payment of the deposit
- Penalties for non-compliance apply even if the registration is done late
- Grants the court discretion to award 1x to 3x the deposit amount as a sanction, instead of 3x in all cases
- The penalties for non-compliance apply even once the tenancy has ended

== Claims process ==
Either a Landlord or a tenant may begin the claims process from 14 days after the end of the tenancy. The first step in beginning a claim is to obtain a so-called Statutory Declaration by accessing the Landlord or tenant's online account, and starting the process using an online form. Once a claim has begun, the dispute service in question makes contact with both parties notifying them of the dispute, and requesting any additional evidence, before the claim is referred to an alternative dispute resolution service, unless either party states that they do not wish to use the ADR service or notifies in writing that they wish to resolve the dispute in the county courts, or alternatively another dispute resolution service.

== Localism Act 2011 ==
The Housing Act left open a loophole for landlords and letting agents. Although there was a penalty for not protecting the deposit or issuing prescribed information, there was no penalty for not doing so within the original 14 day limit. To close this loophole, the Localism Act 2011 extended the time limit for protecting tenancy deposits from 14 to 30 days, and this limit became absolute. Therefore, on the 31st day after the payment of the deposit money to the landlord the tenant can make an application to the court if the money has not been protected and the prescribed information given. Even if the deposit is registered or the prescribed information is given at any time after the 30-day window the tenant still has a right to make a claim. The claim will be for the return of the full sum of the deposit along with a penalty of between one and three times the sum of the deposit, to be awarded at the discretion of the Court. Tenants can also now make an application to a county court for a penalty award after the tenancy has ended.

== Evidence in disputes ==
When a dispute is referred to a scheme's alternative dispute resolution service, the landlord is responsible for proving entitlement to any part of the deposit they wish to keep. Signed check-in and check-out inventory reports are treated as key evidence, because they allow the condition of the property at the start and end of the tenancy to be compared. The Deposit Protection Service advises that reports should be signed by all parties where possible, that date-stamped before-and-after photographs allow adjudicators to see the reason for a claim, and that an unsigned, non-independent report without photographs is unlikely to be persuasive.

Adjudicators also consider whether the condition claimed for is more than fair wear and tear, taking into account factors such as the length of the tenancy and the number and age of occupants. The Deposit Protection Service cites the definition of fair wear and tear as "reasonable use of the premises by the tenant and the ordinary operation of natural forces". A claim should compensate the landlord for loss and should not be used to upgrade the property at the tenant's expense, known as betterment. Adjudicators may ask for receipts or other evidence of an item's age, and its cost and quality when new.

== Alternatives ==
There are a number of “no deposit” or “zero deposit” schemes in operation that are provided by insurance companies. These can offer landlords protection without having to take a deposit.

Bond schemes are an alternative for those unable to afford a deposit. They are commonly used as a homelessness prevention measure.

== See also ==
- Rent control in England and Wales
