= Security deposit =

Sum of money held as security for an agreement

A security deposit is a sum of money held in trust.

In leasing, security deposits, also known as "rent deposits", are required most often by lessors of automobiles, residential property, and commercial real estate.

== By country ==
=== United States ===
The United States Supreme Court ruled in Commissioner v. Indianapolis Power & Light Co. (1990) that a deposit differs from an advance payment because the depositing party has dominion over the funds and retains the right to insist upon repayment in cash. On the other hand, the party making an advance payment retains no right to insist upon the return of the funds as long as the recipient fulfills the contractual agreement.

The security deposits required by many residential landlords of their tenants are the source of much dispute and litigation. Many states and municipalities have enacted laws that specifically regulate the landlord's ability to withhold tenant security deposits after a tenant moves out. Some states and cities require that interest be paid to the tenant as it is earned on the security deposit. The rate of interest earned on security deposits typically changes each year. As of January 2026, this rate is set at .49% in the state of Connecticut. The rate is .01% in Chicago, Illinois, but this rate is only payable on buildings with a certain occupancy threshold.

A landlord's deductions from a tenant's security deposit must be reasonable. The landlord may make deductions for missing rent payments and for damages beyond ordinary wear and tear, which is the subject matter's depreciation or deterioration in value by reasonable and ordinary use by the tenant. Examples of non-deductible wear and tear include: paint retouching, minor cleaning, small tack holes, and nicks and scratches. Examples of deductible damages include large or excessive holes in the wall, carpet stains, and broken doors and windows.

If a landlord wrongfully withholds a tenant's security deposit, the tenant may be entitled to additional damages beyond the amount of the security deposit. These may include statutory damages for violation of a local statute on consumer collection practices, damages that may be two or three times the amount of the deposit (in some states, such as California), consequential (resulting) damages, interest, and in more rare instances punitive damages.

In the United States, Washington, DC, Alaska, Illinois, and Wisconsin have notably more tenant-friendly legislation than states like Indiana or Michigan, for example. The cities of Madison, Wisconsin, and Chicago, Illinois, have substantially greater protection of tenants' security deposit rights than the surrounding areas.

Studies have shown that landlords often improperly withhold security deposits after tenants move out, and often get away with it because it's too much trouble to fight.

In June 2019, changes to the condominium and cooperative laws in New York created limits for the regulations behind security deposits. Cooperative boards can no longer charge more than one month of prepaid maintenance and another month's maintenance as a security deposit restricting the amount to be owed before moving in.

In states which are more tenant-friendly, like Connecticut, the amount an owner can charge for a security deposit in any property is limited to the equivalent of two months' rent. This limit is reduced to one month's rent for tenants age 62 and over.

=== England and Wales ===
In England and Wales, a security or rental deposit may be documented in a rent deposit deed, which is a separate agreement supplementary to a lease agreement.

=== India ===
In metropolitan cities of India like Chennai, Bangalore, Mumbai or others, there is security deposit to be given upfront to the landlord before renting/leasing an apartment. This security deposit amount can range anywhere from 3– 11 months, depending upon city's norm. With rentals soaring high in metropolitan cities, this amount becomes exorbitant. Security deposits offer landlords a layer of financial protection against potential losses due to tenant-caused damages or unpaid rent.

== See also ==
- Collateral (finance)
- Damage deposit
- Deposit (finance)
- Earnest payment
- Escrow
- Key money
- Lease

== Bibliography ==
- Donaldson, Samuel A. Federal Income Taxation Of Individuals: Cases, Problems and Materials (2nd ed.). St. Paul: Thomson West, 2007. pg. 145.
