= Bond scheme (housing) =

Term related to real estate in the United Kingdom

In the United Kingdom a bond scheme is an alternative to a landlord taking a deposit from their tenant(s). They are usually run by councils, housing associations or charities and operate with the scheme operator guaranteeing any losses the landlord suffers due to the damage by the tenant(s).
