= Damage deposit =

A damage deposit or deposit is a sum of money paid in relation to a rented item to ensure it is returned in good condition. They are particularly common in relation to rented accommodation, where they may also be referred to as a tenancy deposit, bond deposit, or bond.

The owner of the item (the landlord in the case of accommodation) will take a sum of money from the person(s) renting the item (the tenant). If the item is returned in good condition at the conclusion of the tenancy the owner should return the deposit. If the item is returned with damage beyond normal wear and tear, the cost of repairing that damage may be charged against the deposit, and part (or none) of the deposit will be returned.

In some jurisdictions such as the Australian states of Victoria and Queensland and in New Zealand, bond funds are held in trust by a government body and released upon agreement from both parties; failing accord of the two parties, an independent tribunal determines the distribution of the bond. In the United Kingdom deposits for all assured shorthold tenancies must be held in a tenancy deposit scheme, under the terms of the Housing Act 2004.

== See also ==
- Collateral (finance)
- Key money
- Rental agreement
- Security deposit
