= Quasi-delict =

Quasi-delict is a French legal term used in some civil law jurisdictions, encompassing the common law concept of negligence as the breach of a non-wilful extra-contractual obligation to third parties.

== See also ==
- Law of Obligations
- Tort
