= Pledge (law) =

Type of legal relationship

A pledge is a bailment that conveys title to property owned by a debtor (the pledgor) to a creditor (the pledgee) to secure repayment for some debt or obligation and to the mutual benefit of both parties. The term is also used to denote the property which constitutes the security. The pledge is a type of security interest. Pledge is the pignus of Roman law, from which most of the modern European-based law on the subject is derived, but is generally a feature of even the most basic legal systems. A pledge of personal property is known as a pawn.

== Features ==
The pledgee has the right of selling the pledge if the pledgor fails to make payment at the stipulated time. No title to a third party purchaser is guaranteed following a wrongful sale except in the case of property passing by delivery, such as money or negotiable securities. In all other cases, persons must show that they are a bona fide purchaser, for (good) value, without notice (BFP). In the case of some types of property as defined on the detailed laws of the jurisdiction, such a new possessor (BFP) must have first consulted (before purchase) revealing no other ownership and then made a public notice or registered their title in a court-recognized register before the pledgor.

== By legal system ==
=== Civil law system ===
In earlier medieval law, especially in Germanic law, two types of pledge existed, being either possessory (cf. Old English wed, Old French gage, Old High German wetti, Latin pignus depositum), i.e., delivered from the outset, or nonpossessory (cf. OE bād, OFr nam, nant, OHG pfant, L pignus oppositum), i.e., distrained on the maturity date, and the latter essentially gave rise to the legal principle of distraint. This distinction still remains in some systems, e.g. French gage vs. nantissement and Dutch vuistpand vs. stil pand. Token (symbolic) reciprocal pledges were commonly incorporated into formal ceremonies as a way of solidifying agreements and other transactions. A pledge of real property which allowed the use and occupation of the pledged property, in lieu of interest on the loan, used to be called an antichresis, but contemporary law of most civil law jurisdictions only allows hypothec as the sole security interest applicable to real estate and (in some cases) marine vessels (ship hypothec), while allowing only pledges (but not hypothec) of other collaterals, including corporeal movables other than marine vessels, as well as securities and intangible assets such as intellectual property rights.

Therefore, a pledge in civil law jurisdictions typically corresponds in common law jurisdictions to any possessory or a nonpossessory lien, excluding mortgage or other lien related to property covered exclusively by a hypothec, namely real estate and (in some jurisdictions) a marine vessel (ship hypothec).

=== Common law system ===
In English law, the pledge is in the possession of the pledgee, as opposed to a nonpossessory lien or a mortgage. Another difference between Roman and English law is that certain things (e.g. apparel, furniture and instruments of tillage) could not be pledged in Roman law, while there is no such restriction in English law. In the case of a pledge, a special property passes to the pledgee, sufficient to enable him to maintain an action against a wrongdoer, but the general property, that is the property subject to the pledge, remains in the pledgor. As the pledge is for the benefit of both parties, the pledgee is bound to exercise only ordinary care over the pledge. After a wrongful sale by a pledgee (such as if the pledgor has been keeping to his payment schedule and will have the right to redeem the goods if continuing to do so), the pledgor cannot recover the pledge/the value of the pledge without a tender of (full payment of) the amount due (secured under the pledge). That contrasts with the general law of mortgages, which allows most mortgagors to sustain a cause of action (sue) on a wrongful sale to restore the property into their qualified ownership if they bring any payment arrears up to date plus reasonable debt collection and legal costs of the creditor.

=== Mixed law systems ===
The laws of Scotland and of the United States generally agree with that of England as to pledges. The main difference is that in Scotland and in Louisiana, a pledge can be sold only with judicial authority. In some the US states, the common law as it existed apart from the Factors Acts is still followed, but in others, the factor has a more-or-less restricted power to give a title by pledge.

== See also ==
- Collateral (finance)
- Pawnbroker
