= Ernest Garcia =

Ernest Garcia may refer to:

- Ernest Garcia II (born 1957), American billionaire businessman
- Ernest Garcia III (born 1982/1983), his son, American businessman
