= No doc loan =

Loan that doesn't require income documentation

A no documentation loan (no-doc) or low documentation loan (low-doc) refers to loans that do not require borrowers to provide documentation of their income to lenders or do not require much documentation. It is a financial product commonly offered by a mortgage lender to consumers who cannot qualify for normal loan products because of fluctuating or hard-to-verify incomes, such as the self-employed, or to serve long time customers with strong credit. Applicants are often required to provide a substantial down payment, i.e. a larger deposit either through equity in security or personal savings.

Self-employed, unemployed, seasonal workers, and new immigrants generally struggle to meet strict requirements to qualify for loans. A loan with few to no documentation or credit history requirements is easier to qualify for, but generally carries a significantly higher interest rate. The term came to prominence during the 2008 financial crisis when up to one-third of all new mortgages issued were no-doc or low-doc loans.

== Low doc loans ==
Residential low doc loans are designed for self-employed borrowers who cannot provide tax returns as evidence of their income. They still require some form of supporting evidence of the borrowers income, typically in the form of BAS statements, although some lenders will accept an accountant's declaration or bank statements.

The high levels of arrears from low doc loans originated prior to 2008 have caused lenders to use restrictive credit scoring for new low doc loan applications. For this reason the proportion of low doc loans written by the major banks has dropped significantly.

== No doc loans ==
No doc loans do not require any supporting evidence of the borrowers income, just a declaration confirming that the borrower can afford the proposed repayments. This is known as an asset lend as the assessment of the loan is primarily focused on the saleability of the security property and the proposed exit strategy.

The loan must be National Consumer Credit Protection Act unregulated as they do not meet the NCCP requirement to reasonably verify the borrowers situation. For this reason most no doc loans are for business purposes or are for investment in something other than residential property.

Private money is the main source of no doc loans, often with interest rates charged at 2% to 6% per month (24% to 72% p.a.). Non-conforming lenders focus on the lower risk no doc loans and offer more competitive interest rates. With either lender type the term of the loan is usually six to twelve months and often has expensive fees or a high interest rate for extending the loan.

== In Australia ==
Australian low–doc and no-doc loans were created primarily to give the self-employed the opportunity to obtain personal loans in circumstances where a lack of documentation such as payslips and group certificates would normally make this impossible. They usually entail a higher interest rate than standard loans. According to the Reserve Bank of Australia, low-doc loans represent around 5% of bank assets and borrowers using these loans are four times more likely to default than those on standard mortgages.

=== Controversy ===
These loans were widely abused by banks, mortgage brokers and borrowers and banks due to the minimal documentation requirements. During a Senate inquiry Australian banks were accused of giving low-doc loans to people who could not afford them and doctoring paperwork to make the loans appear viable. Regulations were eventually tightened during the 2008 financial crisis. Consumer advocate, Denise Brailey claimed to have seen around 400 low-doc or no-doc loan applications which all showed signs of tampering after being signed. One application showed a person on $40,000 per year as earning nearly $180,000 per year.

Elderly people were often targeted by banks such as Westpac and convinced to take out large loans on Ponzi scheme-type property and other investments, often promising high returns as a financial "nest egg". Many investors lost their savings and/ or homes in through these schemes and some financial institutions have subsequently refused to give borrowers copies of their loan applications. Documents were produced at the inquiry which showed bank business development managers promoting methods for mortgage brokers to subvert the lenders requirements. Senator John Williams has criticised the Australian Securities & Investments Commission's lack of action on the matter and called for a Royal Commission into the affair.

One former mortgage broker of the year, Kate Thompson has admitted to using inflated figures for borrower's assets and earnings. However she insists she was encouraged by banks to carry out this deception using financial tricks like claiming capital growth such as rising house prices as income. Thompson has also alleged that banks would on occasion go to her office to write up these applications themselves. As well as falsifying assets and incomes it has also been alleged that temporary ABN (Australian Business Numbers) were also set up to provide business loans to individuals. So far Westpac, Macquarie Bank, National Australia Bank, ANZ and the Commonwealth Bank have all been implicated in the affair. The MFAA has argued that the incidence of low-doc loan frauds prior to the GFC were "minuscule".

== In the United States ==
No-doc loans are also controversial in the US. They had higher interest rates and higher fees. They became popular during the housing bubble of 2004-6. Around 2005, low- and no-documentation loans stopped being an obscure and specialized type of loan for borrowers with fluctuating or hard-to-verify incomes,

and took on an entirely different character. Nonprime lenders now boasted they could offer borrowers the convenience of quicker decisions and not having to provide tons of paperwork. In return, they charged a higher interest rate. The idea caught on: from 2000 to 2007, low- and no-doc loans skyrocketed from less than 2% to roughly 9% of all outstanding loans. Among Alt-A securitizations, 80% of loans issued in 2006 had limited or no documentation. As William Black, a former banking regulator, testified before the FCIC, the mortgage industry's own fraud specialists described stated income loans as "an open 'invitation to fraud' that justified the industry term 'liar's loans.'"

Angelo Mozilo's Countrywide Financial designed a "Fast-N-Easy loan for mortgage lender Fannie Mae. "It required no documentation of a borrower's income or assets and gave loans to borrowers who debt-to-income levels were far higher - 50% - than what was required by other lenders." During 2005 68% of "option ARM" loans originated by Countrywide and Washington Mutual had low- or no-documentation requirements.

According to Michael Calhoun of the Center for Responsible Lending, home buyers would come to lenders "with their W-2 and end up with a no-doc loan simply because the broker was getting paid more and the lender was getting paid more and there was extra yield left over for Wall Street because the loan carried a higher interest rate."

== See also ==
- Alt-A – Type of U.S. mortgage
- Housing bubble – Real-estate bubble involving housing
- Stated income loan – Mortgage where borrowers state their income
- Subprime lending – Loans to people with higher credit risk
- Subprime mortgage crisis – 2007 mortgage crisis in the United States
- No income, no asset – Mortgage lending concept
- Poverty industry – Businesses that make most of their money from the poor
- Predatory lending – Unethical lending practices
