= Predatory mortgage servicing =

Predatory mortgage servicing is abusive, unfair, deceptive, or fraudulent mortgage servicing practices of some mortgage servicers during the mortgage servicing process. There is no legal definition in the United States for predatory mortgage servicing. However, the term is widely used and accepted by state and federal regulatory agencies such as the Federal Deposit Insurance Corporation, Consumer Financial Protection Bureau, Office of the Comptroller of the Currency, Federal Trade Commission and Government Sponsored Enterprises (GSEs) such as Fannie Mae and Freddie Mac.

== Relevant practices ==
Predatory mortgage servicing typically occurs on subprime, Alt-A, scratch and dent, and toxic mortgages that are being serviced by special or default servicers or servicers and lenders that are financially in trouble. There are many motives for predatory servicing practices and a report titled Misbehavior and Mistake in Bankruptcy Mortgage Claim by Katie Porter, professor of law at the University of Iowa (now member of the United States House of Representatives) details the effects and damages caused by servicing abuses.

In mortgage securitization transactions, the mortgage servicer forwards the borrower's payment of principal and interest to the certificate holders (investors) of the special securitized trust that owns and holds the promissory notes secured by the mortgages and deeds of trust. The mortgage servicer, however, is allowed to retain late fees, BPO fees, inspection fees, and other fees charged or assessed to a borrower's account. In addition to the fee income, the servicer is allowed to retain the net liquidation proceeds of any foreclosure sale (net after foreclosure expenses and principal balance to investors).

This provides an incentive to unscrupulous servicers who aggressively interpret mortgage documents to add additional fees to a borrower's mortgage account. Many times, the additional fees added on create an event of default allowing the mortgage servicer to foreclose on the property. This practice is commonly referred to as manufacturing a default or manufactured default.

== Legality ==
While there are no specific laws against predatory mortgage servicing abuses, there are local, state, and federal laws against many of the specific practices commonly identified as predatory mortgage servicing abuses, and various state and federal agencies use the term as a catch-all term for many specific illegal activities in the mortgage servicing industry. Predatory mortgage servicing is not to be confused with predatory lending which is used to describe the unfair, deceptive, or fraudulent practices of mortgage brokers and lenders during the mortgage loan origination process.

== See also ==
- Causes of the United States housing bubble
- Consumer fraud
- Mortgage discrimination
- Mortgage-backed securities
- Poverty industry
- United States housing bubble
