= 5/6 =

5/6 may refer to:

- May 6 (month-day date notation)
- June 5 (day-month date notation)
  - The Qatar diplomatic crisis, which began on 5 June 2017
- 5 shillings and 6 pence in UK predecimal currency
- 5-6 moneylending, an informal loan arrangement in the Philippines
- A fraction representing the value 0.833333333333333...
