= Poverty, Inc. =

- Film poster
- Directed by: Michael Matheson Miller
- Written by: Michael Matheson Miller; Jonathan Witt
- Produced by: Michael Matheson Miller
- Release date: December 5, 2014
- Running time: 94 minutes
- Country: United States
- Language: English

Poverty, Inc. is a 91-minute documentary inquiry into the nature of human flourishing and the effects of the multibillion dollar poverty industrial complex erected to promote it. The film challenges current perceptions of global charity and promotes entrepreneurship as an effective alternative to alleviating world poverty. The film was made by the Acton Institute, a free market think tank.

== Production and synopsis ==
The filming started in 2010. Directed by Michael Matheson Miller and drawing from over 200 interviews filmed in 20 countries, Poverty, Inc. explores the neocolonial power dynamics embedded paternalism underpinning the predominant modes of assistance, which often situate “the poor” (i.e. “the other”) as the objects of charity rather than as the active protagonists in their own stories.

The film has the tag-line, “Fighting poverty is big business, but who profits the most?” One of the things the film looks at is charitable institutions and their role in fighting poverty. It questions whether aid institutions themselves are sometimes a hindrance to fighting poverty. The film features Herman Chinery-Hesse, Hernando de Soto and Nobel Peace Prize winner Mohammad Yunus. Also mentioned in the film are Bill Clinton and Bono. A significant proportion of the film focuses on the unintended consequences of a policy to subsidize rice exports from the US to Haiti under the Clinton Administration in the 1990s, which he later admitted was a failure with additional coverage in the film of the reality of Haiti orphanages and the work of the Apparent Project to help bring parents out of poverty.

== Critical reception ==
Peter Debruge of Variety wrote, "As if poverty weren't a challenging enough phenomenon unto itself, time has revealed that good intentions by outsiders can in many cases make the problem worse – a cruel irony that serves as the basis of Michael Matheson Miller’s Poverty Inc., an easy-to-understand docu-essay with a tough-to-accept message, especially as it implies that some aid organizations may actually be cashing in on their concern." And about the director: "Miller avoids the manipulative tricks of lesser filmmakers, presenting his argument with lucidity and reason. Whereas others give without thinking, Poverty Inc. provides genuine food for thought."

Jessi Cape of the Austin Chronicle wrote, "This is a not a sappy documentary – it is all about data: tax loopholes, jobs, geopolitics, property rights, gender issues, rule of law, and much else."

Justice Network, an anti-human trafficking NGO, commented, "It's a raw look at what we're doing wrong and what could be done right."

Economist Jose Caraballo-Cueto wrote in the Huffington Post that the film relies heavily on anecdotes, committing "what economists call the fallacy of composition." The film was also critiqued for conflating foreign aid, NGO work, and the work of international development organizations, blurring the distinction between charity and support for development.

In reviewing the film, Jeff Bloem of the Center for Public Justice argues: "It is exceedingly dangerous to only consider aid spending that has not lead [sic] to the reduction of poverty while disregarding the aid spending that actually does produce worthwhile results" and cites the eradication of smallpox as an example of successful aid efforts.

== Awards ==
Anthem Film Festival

- FreedomFest Grand Prize
- Documentary Feature, Excellence in Filmmaking
- Audience Choice Award, Feature length

Bahamas International Film Festival

- Best Documentary

Chagrin Documentary Film Fest

- Emerging Filmmaker Award

Docutah Film Festival

- Best Picture

FirstGlance Film Festival Philadelphia

- Emerging Filmmaker Award

== Official selection ==
- Austin Film Festival 2014
- Chicago International Social Change Film Festival 2014
- Leeds Film Festival
- San Luis Obispo International Film Festival
- Thessaloniki Documentary Film Festival
- World Unite Film Festival
- Afrika Film Festival – Leuven 2016

== See also ==
- The Call of the Entrepreneur
