= Causes of the 2000s United States housing bubble =

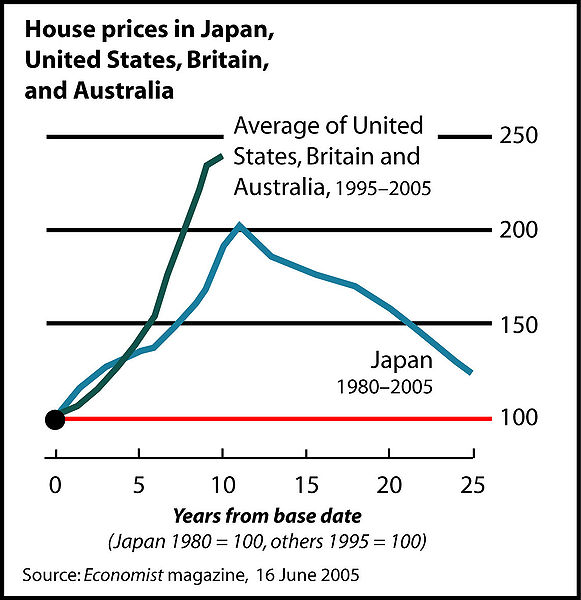
Inflation-adjusted housing prices in Japan (1980–2005) compared to home price appreciation the United States, Britain, and Australia (1995–2005).

Approximate cost to own mortgaged property vs. renting.
An approximate formula for the monthly cost of owning a home is obtained by computing the monthly mortgage, property tax, and maintenance costs, accounting for the U.S. tax deduction available for mortgage interest payments and property taxes. This formula does not include the cost of foregoing the standard deduction (required for taking the tax deduction). Assuming a home cost of P dollars, yearly interest rate r fixed over N years, marginal income tax rate $r_{\rm IT}$, property tax rate $r_{\rm PT}$ (assumed to be 0.5–2% of P), and yearly maintenance cost rate $r_{\rm M}$ (assumed to be 0.5–1% of P), the monthly cost of home ownership is approximately

$$\scriptstyle{\scriptstyle{\rm cost}}\approx \Big(\big(\frac{r}{1-(1+r)^{-N}} +r_{\rm PT}\big)$$
$$\scriptstyle{}\qquad{}\times(1-r_{\rm IT})+r_{\rm M}\Big)\times P/12.$$

For example, the monthly cost of a $250,000 home at 6% interest fixed over 30 years, with 1% property taxes, 0.75% maintenance costs, and a 30% federal income tax rate is approximately $1361 per month. The rental cost for an equivalent home may be less in many U.S. cities as of 2006. Adding a down payment or home equity to this calculation can significantly reduce the monthly cost of ownership, while significantly reducing the income stream that the downpayment would generate in a long term CD. Including the monthly cost of forgoing the standard deduction ($10,000 for a married couple), the added cost (the reduction in tax savings) of (deduction * tax_rate / 12) would increase the cost to buy a home by $250/mo, to $1611 for a married couple filing jointly in the example above.

This calculation focuses on monthly cash-flow costs and does not account for changes in net worth associated with homeownership. In particular, it excludes equity accumulation through principal payments, the conversion of a down payment from cash to home equity, and potential home price appreciation. While these factors do not reduce monthly expenses, they may significantly affect long-term wealth outcomes and are relevant when comparing renting and owning over longer time horizon

Equivalent price-to-earnings (P/E) ratio for homes.
To compute the P/E ratio for the case of a rented house, divide the price of the house by its potential yearly earnings or net income, which is the market rent of the house minus expenses, which include property taxes, maintenance and fees. This formula is:

$$\textstyle{\scriptstyle{\rm P/E\ ratio}} = \frac{{\rm Price}}{{\rm Rent} - {\rm Expenses}}.$$

For the example of the $250,000 home considered above, the P/E ratio would be 24 if this home rents for $1250 per month. Fortune cites a historic range of 11 or 12 for the simpler price-to-rent ratio.

Observers and analysts have attributed the reasons for the 2001–2006 housing bubble and its 2007–10 collapse in the United States to "everyone from home buyers to Wall Street, mortgage brokers to Alan Greenspan". Other factors that are named include "Mortgage underwriters, investment banks, rating agencies, and investors", "low mortgage interest rates, low short-term interest rates, relaxed standards for mortgage loans, and irrational exuberance" Politicians in both the Democratic and Republican political parties have been cited for "pushing to keep derivatives unregulated" and "with rare exceptions" giving Fannie Mae and Freddie Mac "unwavering support".

According to a 2018 review of existing evidence, "inflated house-price expectations across the economy played a central role in driving both the demand for and the supply of mortgage credit before the crisis". The review concluded that the crisis was not driven by reckless lending by lower classes, but rather greater mortgage lending across all income groups.

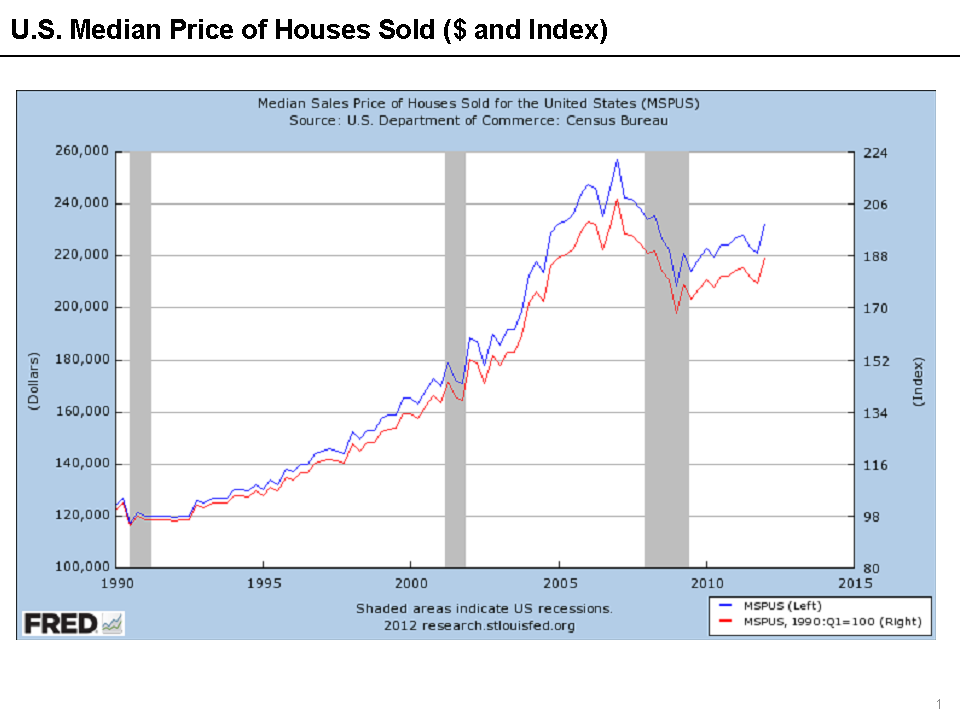
U.S. Median Price of Homes Sold

== Government policies ==
=== Housing tax policy ===
In July 1978, Section 121 allowed for a $100,000 (~$386,863 in 2025) one-time exclusion in capital gains for sellers 55 years or older at the time of sale. In 1981, the Section 121 exclusion was increased from $100,000 to $125,000. The Tax Reform Act of 1986 eliminated the tax deduction for interest paid on credit cards. As mortgage interest remained deductible, this encouraged the use of home equity through refinancing, second mortgages, and home equity lines of credit (HELOC) by consumers.

The Taxpayer Relief Act of 1997 repealed the Section 121 exclusion and section 1034 rollover rules, and replaced them with a $500,000 married/$250,000 single exclusion of capital gains on the sale of a home, available once every two years. This made housing the only investment which escaped capital gains. These tax laws encouraged people to buy expensive, fully mortgaged homes, as well as invest in second homes and investment properties, as opposed to investing in stocks, bonds, or other assets.

=== Deregulation ===
Historically, the financial sector was heavily regulated by the Glass–Steagall Act which separated commercial and investment banks. It also set strict limits on Banks' interest rates and loans.

Starting in the 1980s, considerable deregulation took place in banking. Banks were deregulated through:

- The Depository Institutions Deregulation and Monetary Control Act of 1980 (allowing similar banks to merge and set any interest rate).
- The Garn–St. Germain Depository Institutions Act of 1982 (allowing Adjustable-rate mortgages).
- The Gramm–Leach–Bliley Act of 1999 (allowing commercial and investment banks to merge).

Federal Home Loan Bank Board allowed federal S&Ls to originate Adjustable-rate mortgages in 1979 and in 1981 the Comptroller of the Currency extended the privilege to national banks. This regulation, enacted during times when fixed-rate loans at 17% were beyond the reach of many prospective home-owners, led to a series of innovations in adjustable-rate financing that contributed the easy credit that help fuel the housing bubble.

Several authors single out the banking deregulation by the Gramm–Leach–Bliley Act as significant. Nobel Prize-winning economist Paul Krugman has called Senator Phil Gramm "the father of the financial crisis" due to his sponsorship of the act but later revised his viewpoint saying repealing Glass-Steagall is "not what caused the financial crisis, which arose instead from 'shadow banks.'" Nobel Prize-winning economist Joseph Stiglitz has also argued that GLB helped to create the crisis. An article in The Nation has made the same argument.

Economists Robert Ekelund and Mark Thornton have also criticized the Act as contributing to the Subprime mortgage crisis. They state that while "in a world regulated by a gold standard, 100% reserve banking, and no FDIC deposit insurance" the Financial Services Modernization Act would have made "perfect sense" as a legitimate act of deregulation, but under the present fiat monetary system it "amounts to corporate welfare for financial institutions and a moral hazard that will make taxpayers pay dearly." Critics have also noted de facto deregulation through a shift in mortgage securitization market share from more highly regulated Government Sponsored Enterprises to less regulated investment banks.

However, many economists, analysts and politicians reject the criticisms of the GLB legislation. Brad DeLong, a former advisor to President Clinton and economist at the University of California, Berkeley and Tyler Cowen of George Mason University have both argued that the Gramm-Leach-Bliley Act softened the impact of the crisis by allowing for mergers and acquisitions of collapsing banks as the crisis unfolded in late 2008. "Alice M. Rivlin, who served as a deputy director of the Office of Management and Budget under Bill Clinton, said that GLB was a necessary piece of legislation because the separation of investment and commercial banking 'wasn't working very well.' Even Bill Clinton stated (in 2008): 'I don't see that signing that bill had anything to do with the current crisis'".

=== Mandated loans ===
Republican Senator Marco Rubio has stated that the housing crisis was "created by reckless government policies". Republican appointee to the Financial Crisis Inquiry Commission Peter J. Wallison and coauthor Edward Pinto believed that the housing bubble and crash was due to federal mandates to promote affordable housing. These were applied through the Community Reinvestment Act and "government sponsored entities" (GSE's) "Fannie Mae" (Federal National Mortgage Association) and "Freddie Mac" (Federal Home Loan Mortgage Corporation). Journalist Daniel Indiviglio argues the two GSE's played a major role, while not denying the importance of Wall Street and others in the private sector in creating the collapse.

The Housing and Urban Development Act of 1992 established an affordable housing loan purchase mandate for Fannie Mae and Freddie Mac, and that mandate was to be regulated by HUD. Initially, the 1992 legislation required that 30 percent or more of Fannie's and Freddie's loan purchases be related to affordable housing. However, HUD was given the power to set future requirements. In 1995 HUD mandated that 40 percent of Fannie's and Freddie's loan purchases would have to support affordable housing. In 1996, HUD directed Freddie and Fannie to provide at least 42% of their mortgage financing to borrowers with income below the median in their area. This target was increased to 50% in 2000 and 52% in 2005. Under the Bush Administration HUD continued to pressure Fannie and Freddie to increase affordable housing purchases – to as high as 56 percent by the year 2008. To satisfy these mandates, Fannie and Freddie eventually announced low-income and minority loan commitments totalling $5 (~$7.33 trillion in 2025) trillion. Critics argue that, to meet these commitments, Fannie and Freddie promoted a loosening of lending standards - industry-wide.

Regarding the Community Reinvestment Act (CRA), economist Stan Liebowitz wrote in the New York Post that a strengthening of the CRA in the 1990s encouraged a loosening of lending standards throughout the banking industry. He also charged the Federal Reserve with ignoring the negative impact of the CRA. American Enterprise Institute Scholar Edward Pinto noted that, in 2008, Bank of America reported that its CRA portfolio, which constituted only 7 percent of its owned residential mortgages, was responsible for 29 percent of its losses. A Cleveland Plain Dealer investigation found that "The City of Cleveland has aggravated its vexing foreclosure problems and has lost millions in tax dollars by helping people buy homes they could not afford." The newspaper added that these problem mortgages "typically came from local banks fulfilling federal requirements to lend money in poorer neighbourhoods".

Others argue that "pretty much all the evidence on the housing crisis shows" that Fannie Mae, Freddie Mac, the (CRA) and their affordability goals were not a major reason for the bubble and crash.

Law professor David Min argues that view (blaming GSE's and CRA) "is clearly contradicted by the facts", namely that

- Parallel bubble-bust cycles occurred outside of the residential housing markets (for example, in commercial real estate and consumer credit).
- Parallel financial crises struck other countries, which did not have analogous affordable housing policies
- The U.S. government's market share of home mortgages was actually declining precipitously during the housing bubble of the 2000s.

However, according to Peter J. Wallison, other developed countries with "large bubbles during the 1997–2007 period" had "far lower ... losses associated with mortgage delinquencies and defaults" because (according to Wallison), these countries' bubbles were not supported by a huge number of government mandated substandard loans – generally with low or no downpayments" as was the case in the US.

Other analysis calls into question the validity of comparing the residential loan crisis to the commercial loan crisis. After researching the default of commercial loans during the financial crisis, Xudong An and Anthony B. Sanders reported (in December 2010): "We find limited evidence that substantial deterioration in CMBS [commercial mortgage-backed securities] loan underwriting occurred prior to the crisis." Other analysts support the contention that the crisis in commercial real estate and related lending took place after the crisis in residential real estate. Business journalist Kimberly Amadeo reports: "The first signs of decline in residential real estate occurred in 2006. Three years later, commercial real estate started feeling the effects. Denice A. Gierach, a real estate attorney and CPA, wrote:

most of the commercial real estate loans were good loans destroyed by a really bad economy. In other words, the borrowers did not cause the loans to go bad, it was the economy.

In their book on the 2008 financial crisis, Business journalists Bethany McLean and Joe Nocera argue that the charges against Fannie and Freddie are "completely upside down; Fannie and Freddie raced to get into subprime mortgages because they feared being left behind by their nongovernment competitors."

Most early estimates showed that the subprime mortgage boom and the subsequent crash were very much concentrated in the private market, not the public market of Fannie Mae and Freddie Mac. According to an estimate made by the Federal Reserve in 2008, more than 84 percent of the subprime mortgages came from private lending institutions in 2006. The share of subprime loans insured by Fannie Mae and Freddie Mac also decreased as the bubble got bigger (from a high of insuring 48 percent to insuring 24 percent of all subprime loans in 2006).

To make its estimate, the Federal Reserve did not directly analyze the characteristics of the loans (such as downpayment sizes); rather, it assumed that loans carrying interest rates 3% or more higher than normal rates were subprime and loans with lower interest rates were prime. Critics dispute the Federal Reserve's use of interest rates to distinguish prime from subprime loans. They say that subprime loan estimates based on use of the high-interest-rate proxy are distorted because government programs generally promote low-interest rate loans – even when the loans are to borrowers who are clearly subprime.

According to Min, while Fannie and Freddie did buy high-risk mortgage-backed securities,

they did not buy enough of them to be blamed for the mortgage crisis. Highly respected analysts who have looked at these data in much greater detail than Wallison, Pinto, or myself, including the nonpartisan Government Accountability Office, the Harvard Joint Center for Housing Studies, the Financial Crisis Inquiry Commission majority, the Federal Housing Finance Agency, and virtually all academics, including the University of North Carolina, Glaeser et al. at Harvard, and the St. Louis Federal Reserve, have all rejected the Wallison/Pinto argument that federal affordable housing policies were responsible for the proliferation of actual high-risk mortgages over the past decade.

Min's contention that Fannie and Freddie did not buy a significant amount of high-risk mortgage backed securities must be evaluated in light of subsequent SEC security fraud charges brought against executives of Fannie Mae and Freddie Mac in December 2011. Significantly, the SEC alleged (and still maintains) that Fannie Mae and Freddie Mac reported as subprime and substandard less than 10 percent of their actual subprime and substandard loans. In other words, the substandard loans held in the GSE portfolios may have been 10 times greater than originally reported. According to Peter Wallison of the American Enterprise Institute, that would make the SEC's estimate of GSE substandard loans about $2 trillion - significantly higher than Edward Pinto's estimate.

The Federal Reserve also estimated that only six percent of higher-priced loans were extended by Community Reinvestment Act-covered lenders to lower-income borrowers or CRA neighborhoods. (As it did with respect to GSE loans, the Federal Reserve assumed that all CRA loans were prime unless they carried interest rates 3% or more above the normal rate, an assumption disputed by others.) In a 2008 speech, Federal Reserve Governor Randall Kroszner, argued that the CRA could not be responsible for the subprime mortgage crisis, stating that

"first, only a small portion of subprime mortgage originations are related to the CRA. Second, CRA-related loans appear to perform comparably to other types of subprime loans. Taken together... we believe that the available evidence runs counter to the contention that the CRA contributed in any substantive way to the current mortgage crisis"

Others, such as Federal Deposit Insurance Corporation Chairman Sheila Bair, and Ellen Seidman of the New America Foundation also argue that the CRA was not responsible for the crisis. The CRA also only affected one out of the top 25 subprime lenders. According to several economists, Community Reinvestment Act loans outperformed other "subprime" mortgages, and GSE mortgages performed better than private label securitizations.

Nonetheless, economists at the National Bureau of Economic Research concluded that banks undergoing CRA-related regulatory exams took additional mortgage lending risk. The authors of a study entitled "Did the Community Reinvestment Act Lead to Risky Lending?" compared "the lending behavior of banks undergoing CRA exams within a given census tract in a given month (the treatment group) to the behavior of banks operating in the same census tract-month that did not face these exams (the control group). This comparison clearly indicates that adherence to the CRA led to riskier lending by banks." They concluded: "The evidence shows that around CRA examinations, when incentives to conform to CRA standards are particularly high, banks not only increase lending rates but also appear to originate loans that are markedly riskier." Loan delinquency averaged 15% higher in the treatment group than the control group one year after mortgage origination.

=== Historically low interest rates ===
According to some, such as John B. Taylor and Thomas M. Hoenig, "excessive risk-taking and the housing boom" were brought on by the Federal Reserve holding "interest rates too low for too long".

In the wake of the dot-com crash and the subsequent 2001–2002 recession the Federal Reserve dramatically lowered interest rates to historically low levels, from about 6.5% to just 1%. This spurred easy credit for banks to make loans. By 2006 the rates had moved up to 5.25% which lowered the demand and increased the monthly payments for adjustable rate mortgages. The resulting foreclosures increased supply, dropping housing prices further. Former Federal Reserve Board Chairman Alan Greenspan admitted that the housing bubble was "fundamentally engendered by the decline in real long-term interest rates".

Mortgages had been bundled together and sold on Wall Street to investors and other countries looking for a higher return than the 1% offered by Federal Reserve. The percentage of risky mortgages was increased while rating companies claimed they were all top-rated. Instead of the limited regions suffering the housing drop, it was felt around the world. The Congressmen who had pushed to create subprime loans now cited Wall Street and their rating companies for misleading these investors.

Historical chart of the effective federal interest rates, known as the Federal Funds Rate. From 2001 to 2006 interest rates were dramatically lowered (due to the Dot-com crash) but then increased from 2006 to 2007.

In the United States, mortgage rates are typically set in relation to 10-year treasury bond yields, which, in turn, are affected by Federal Funds rates. The Federal Reserve acknowledges the connection between lower interest rates, higher home values, and the increased liquidity the higher home values bring to the overall economy. A Federal Reserve report reads:

Like other asset prices, house prices are influenced by interest rates, and in some countries, the housing market is a key channel of monetary policy transmission.

For this reason, some have criticized then Fed Chairman Alan Greenspan for "engineering" the housing bubble, saying, e.g., "It was the Federal Reserve-engineered decline in rates that inflated the housing bubble." Between 2000 and 2003, the interest rate on 30-year fixed-rate mortgages fell 2.5 percentage points (from 8% to all-time historical low of about 5.5%). The interest rate on one-year adjustable rate mortgages (1/1 ARMs) fell 3 percentage points (from about 7% to about 4%). Richard Fisher, president of the Dallas Fed, said in 2006 that the Fed's low interest-rate policies unintentionally prompted speculation in the housing market, and that the subsequent "substantial correction [is] inflicting real costs to millions of homeowners."

A drop in mortgage interest rates reduces the cost of borrowing and should logically result in an increase in prices in a market where most people borrow money to purchase a home (for instance, in the United States), so that average payments remain constant. If one assumes that the housing market is efficient, the expected change in housing prices (relative to interest rates) can be computed mathematically. The calculation in the sidebox shows that a 1 percentage point change in interest rates would theoretically affect home prices by about 10% (given 2005 rates on fixed-rate mortgages). This represents a 10-to-1 multiplier between percentage point changes in interest rates and percentage change in home prices. For interest-only mortgages (at 2005 rates), this yields about a 16% change in principal for a 1% change in interest rates at current rates. Therefore, the 2% drop in long-term interest rates can account for about a 10 × 2% = 20% rise in home prices if every buyer is using a fixed-rate mortgage (FRM), or about 16 × 3% ≈ 50% if every buyer is using an adjustable rate mortgage (ARM) whose interest rates dropped 3%.

Robert Shiller shows that the inflation adjusted U.S. home price increase has been about 45% during this period, an increase in valuations that is approximately consistent with most buyers financing their purchases using ARMs. In areas of the United States believed to have a housing bubble, price increases have far exceeded the 50% that might be explained by the cost of borrowing using ARMs. For example, in San Diego area, average mortgage payments grew 50% between 2001 and 2004. When interest rates rise, a reasonable question is how much house prices will fall, and what effect this will have on those holding negative equity, as well as on the U.S. economy in general. The salient question is whether interest rates are a determining factor in specific markets where there is high sensitivity to housing affordability. (Thomas Sowell points out that these markets where there is high sensitivity to housing affordability are created by laws that restrict land use and thus its supply. In areas like Houston which has no zoning laws the Fed rate had no effect.)

==== Return to higher rates ====
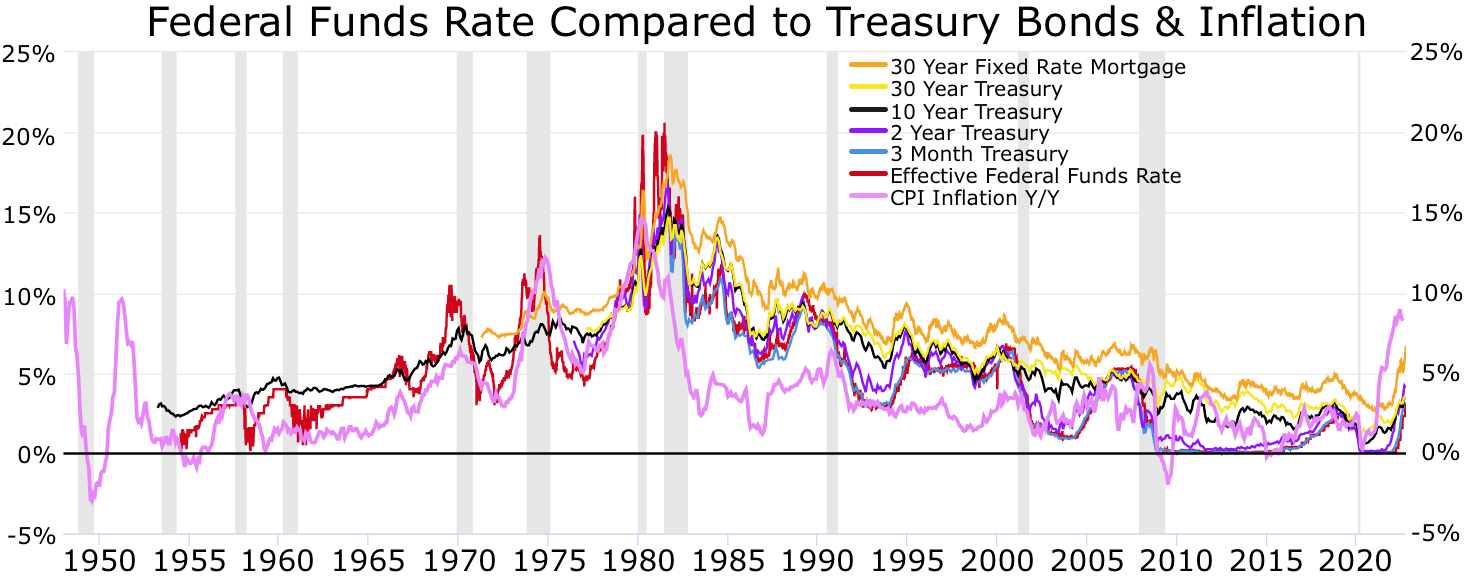
The Federal Reserve raised the Federal funds rate causing an Inverted yield curve to slow inflation and get prices and commodity prices down, that usually puts the economy into a recession. 30 year mortgage average 30 Year Treasury Bond 10 Year Treasury Bond 2 Year Treasury Bond 3 month Treasury Bond Effective Federal Funds Rate CPI inflation year/year Recessions

Between 2004 and 2006, the Fed raised interest rates 17 times, increasing them from 1% to 5.25%, before pausing. The Fed paused raising interest rates because of its concern that an accelerating downturn in the housing market could undermine the overall economy, just as the crash of the dot-com bubble in 2000 contributed to the subsequent recession. New York University economist Nouriel Roubini opined that "The Fed should have tightened earlier to avoid a festering of the housing bubble early on."

There was a great debate as to whether or not the Fed would lower rates in late 2007. The majority of economists expected the Fed to maintain the Fed funds rate at 5.25 percent through 2008; however, on September 18, it lowered the rate to 4.75 percent.

Differential relationship between interest rates and affordability.
An approximate formula can be obtained that provides the relationship between changes in interest rates and changes in home affordability. The computation proceeds by designating affordability (the monthly mortgage payment) constant, and differentiating the equation for monthly payments

$$\textstyle{{\rm monthly}\atop{\rm payment}} = \frac{r}{1-(1+r)^{-N}}{\scriptstyle{{Who}\times\rm Principal}}$$

with respect to the interest rate r, then solving for the change in Principal. Using the approximation $\scriptstyle(1+r/K)^{NK}\approx e^{Nr}$ (K → ∞, and e = 2.718... is the base of the natural logarithm) for continuously compounded interest, this results in the approximate equation

$$\textstyle\frac{\Delta{\rm Principal}}{{\rm Principal}} \approx -\left(1 - \frac{Nre^{-Nr}}{1-e^{-Nr}} \right)\frac{\Delta r}{r}$$

(fixed-rate loans). For interest-only mortgages, the change in principal yielding the same monthly payment is

$$\textstyle\frac{\Delta{\rm Principal}}{{\rm Principal}} \approx -\frac{\Delta r}{r}$$

This calculation shows that a 1 percentage point change in interest rates would theoretically affect home prices by about 10% (given 2005 rates) on fixed-rate mortgages, and about 16% for interest-only mortgages. Robert Shiller does compare interest rates and overall U.S. home prices over the period 1890–2004 and concludes that interest rates do not explain historic trends for the country.

==== Regions affected ====
Home price appreciation has been non-uniform to such an extent that some economists, including former Fed Chairman Alan Greenspan, arguedthat the United States was not experiencing a nationwide housing bubble per se, but a number of local bubbles. However, in 2007 Greenspan admitted that there was in fact a bubble in the US housing market, and that "all the froth bubbles add up to an aggregate bubble".

Despite greatly relaxed lending standards and low interest rates, many regions of the country saw very little growth during the "bubble period". Out of 20 largest metropolitan areas tracked by the S&P/Case-Shiller house price index, six (Dallas, Cleveland, Detroit, Denver, Atlanta, and Charlotte) saw less than 10% price growth in inflation-adjusted terms in 2001–2006. During the same period, seven metropolitan areas (Tampa, Miami, San Diego, Los Angeles, Las Vegas, Phoenix, and Washington DC) appreciated by more than 80%.

Somewhat paradoxically, as the housing bubble deflates some metropolitan areas (such as Denver and Atlanta) have been experiencing high foreclosure rates, even though they did not see much house appreciation in the first place and therefore did not appear to be contributing to the national bubble. This was also true of some cities in the Rust Belt such as Detroit and Cleveland, where weak local economies had produced little house price appreciation early in the decade but still saw declining values and increased foreclosures in 2007. As of January 2009 California, Michigan, Ohio and Florida were the states with the highest foreclosure rates.

== 'Mania' for home ownership ==
Americans' love of their homes is widely known and acknowledged; however, many believe that enthusiasm for home ownership is currently high even by American standards, calling the real estate market "frothy", "speculative madness", and a "mania". Many observers have commented on this phenomenon—as evidenced by the cover of the June 13, 2005 issue of Time magazine (itself taken as a sign of the bubble's peak)—but as a 2007 article in Forbes warns, "to realize that America's mania for home-buying is out of all proportion to sober reality, one needs to look no further than the current subprime lending mess ... As interest rates—and mortgage payments—have started to climb, many of these new owners are having difficulty making ends meet ... Those borrowers are much worse off than before they bought." The boom in housing has also created a boom in the real estate profession; for example, California has a record half-million real estate licencees—one for every 52 adults living in the state, up 57% in the last five years.

The overall U.S. homeownership rate increased from 64 percent in 1994 (about where it was since 1980) to a peak in 2004 with an all-time high of 69.2 percent. Bush's 2004 campaign slogan "the ownership society" indicates the strong preference and societal influence of Americans to own the homes they live in, as opposed to renting. However, in many parts of the United States, rent does not cover mortgage costs; the national median mortgage payment is $1,687 per month, nearly twice the median rent payment of $868 per month, although this ratio can vary significantly from market to market.

Suspicious Activity Reports pertaining to mortgage fraud increased by 1,411 percent between 1997 and 2005. Both borrowers seeking to obtain homes they could not otherwise afford, and industry insiders seeking monetary gain, were implicated.

=== Belief that housing is a good investment ===
Among Americans, home ownership is widely accepted as preferable to renting in many cases, especially when the ownership term is expected to be at least five years. This is partly because the fraction of a fixed-rate mortgage used to pay down the principal builds equity for the homeowner over time, while the interest portion of the loan payments qualifies for a tax break, whereas, except for the personal tax deduction often available to renters but not to homeowners, money spent on rent does neither. However, when considered as an investment, that is, an asset that is expected to grow in value over time, as opposed to the utility of shelter that home ownership provides, housing is not a risk-free investment. The popular notion that, unlike stocks, homes do not fall in value is believed to have contributed to the mania for purchasing homes. Stock prices are reported in real time, which means investors witness the volatility. However, homes are usually valued yearly or less often, thereby smoothing out perceptions of volatility. This assertion that property prices rise has been true for the United States as a whole since the Great Depression, and appears to be encouraged by the real estate industry.

However, housing prices can move both up and down in local markets, as evidenced by the relatively recent price history in locations such as New York, Los Angeles, Boston, Japan, Seoul, Sydney, and Hong Kong; large trends of up and down price fluctuations can be seen in many U.S. cities (see graph). Since 2005, the year-over-year median sale prices (inflation-adjusted) of single family homes in Massachusetts fell over 10% in 2006. Economist David Lereah formerly of the National Association of Realtors (NAR) said in August 2006 that "he expects home prices to come down 5% nationally, more in some markets, less in others." Commenting in August 2005 on the perceived low risk of housing as an investment vehicle, Alan Greenspan said, "history has not dealt kindly with the aftermath of protracted periods of low risk premiums".

Compounding the popular expectation that home prices do not fall, it is also widely believed that home values will yield average or better-than-average returns as investments. The investment motive for purchasing homes should not be conflated with the necessity of shelter that housing provides; an economic comparison of the relative costs of owning versus renting the equivalent utility of shelter can be made separately (see boxed text). Over the holding periods of decades, inflation-adjusted house prices have increased less than 1% per year.

Robert Shiller shows that over long periods, inflation adjusted U.S. home prices increased 0.4% per year from 1890 to 2004, and 0.7% per year from 1940 to 2004. Piet Eichholtz also showed in what has become known as the Herengracht house index, comparable results for housing prices on a single street in Amsterdam (the site of the fabled tulip mania, and where the housing supply is notably limited) over a 350 year period. Such meager returns are dwarfed by investments in the stock and bond markets; although, these investments are not heavily leveraged by fair interest loans. If historic trends hold, it is reasonable to expect home prices to only slightly beat inflation over the long term. Furthermore, one way to assess the quality of any investment is to compute its price-to-earnings (P/E) ratio, which for houses can be defined as the price of the house divided by the potential annual rental income, minus expenses including property taxes, maintenance, insurance, and condominium fees. For many locations, this computation yields a P/E ratio of about 30–40, which is considered by economists to be high for both the housing and the stock markets; historical price-to-rent ratios are 11–12. For comparison, just before the dot-com crash the P/E ratio of the S&P 500 was 45, while in 2005–2007 around 17. In a 2007 article comparing the cost and risks of renting to buying using a buy vs. rent calculator, The New York Times concluded,

Homeownership, [realtors] argue, is a way to achieve the American dream, save on taxes and earn a solid investment return all at the same time. ... [I]t's now clear that people who chose renting over buying in the last two years made the right move. In much of the country ... recent home buyers have faced higher monthly costs than renters and have lost money on their investment in the meantime. It's almost as if they have thrown money away, an insult once reserved for renters.

A 2007 Forbes article titled "Don't Buy That House" invokes similar arguments and concludes that for now, "resist the pressure [to buy]. There may be no place like home, but there's no reason you can't rent it."

=== Promotion in the media ===
In late 2005 and into 2006, there were an abundance of television programs promoting real estate investment and flipping. In addition to the numerous television shows, book stores in cities throughout the United States could be seen showing large displays of books touting real-estate investment, such as NAR chief economist David Lereah's book Are You Missing the Real Estate Boom?, subtitled Why Home Values and Other Real Estate Investments Will Climb Through The End of The Decade - And How to Profit From Them, published in February 2005. One year later, Lereah retitled his book Why the Real Estate Boom Will Not Bust - And How You Can Profit from It.

However, following Federal Reserve chairman Ben Bernanke's comments on the "downturn of the housing market" in August 2006, Lereah said in an NBC interview that "we've had a boom marketplace: you've got to correct because booms cannot sustain itself forever [sic]." Commenting on the phenomenon of shifting NAR accounts of the national housing market (see David Lereah's comments), the Motley Fool reported, "There's nothing funnier or more satisfying ... than watching the National Association of Realtors (NAR) change its tune these days. ... the NAR is full of it and will spin the numbers any way it can to keep up the pleasant fiction that all is well."

Upon leaving the NAR in May 2007, Lereah explained to Robert Siegel of National Public Radio that using the word "boom" in the title was actually his publisher's idea, and "a poor choice of titles".

=== Speculative fever ===
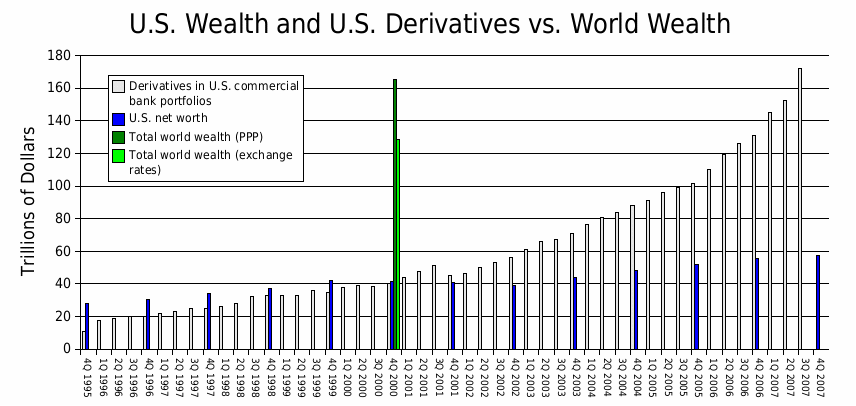
Total US derivatives and total US wealth 1995–2007 compared to total world wealth in the year 2000

The graph above shows the total notional value of derivatives relative to US wealth measures. For the casual observer, in many cases, notional values of derivatives carry little meaning. Often the parties cannot easily agree on terms to close a derivative contract. The common solution has been to create an equal and opposite contract, often with a different party, in order to net payments (Derivatives market#Netting), thus eliminating all but the counterparty risk of the contract, but doubling the nominal value of outstanding contracts.

As median home prices began to rise dramatically in 2000–2001 following the fall in interest rates, speculative purchases of homes also increased. Fortune magazine's article on housing speculation in 2005 said, "America was awash in a stark, raving frenzy that looked every bit as crazy as dot-com stocks." In a 2006 interview in BusinessWeek magazine, Yale economist Robert Shiller said of the impact of speculators on long term valuations, "I worry about a big fall because prices today are being supported by a speculative fever", and former NAR chief economist David Lereah said in 2005 that "[t]here's a speculative element in home buying now." Speculation in some local markets has been greater than others, and any correction in valuations is expected to be strongly related to the percentage amount of speculative purchases. In the same BusinessWeek interview, Angelo Mozilo, CEO of mortgage lender Countrywide Financial, said in March 2006:

In areas where you have had heavy speculation, you could have 30% [home price declines] ... A year or a year and half from now, you will have seen a slow deterioration of home values and a substantial deterioration in those areas where there has been speculative excess.

The chief economist for the National Association of Home Builders, David Seiders, said that California, Las Vegas, Florida and the Washington, D.C., area "have the largest potential for a price slowdown" because the rising prices in those markets were fed by speculators who bought homes intending to "flip" or sell them for a quick profit. Dallas Fed president Richard Fisher said in 2006 that the Fed held its target rate at 1 percent "longer than it should have been" and unintentionally prompted speculation in the housing market.

Various real estate investment advisors openly advocated the use of no money down property flipping, which led to the demise of many speculators who followed this strategy such as Casey Serin.

According to a 2020 study, the main driver behind shifts in house prices were shifts in beliefs, rather than a shift in underlying credit conditions.

=== Buying and selling above normal multiples ===
Home prices, as a multiple of annual rent, have been 15 since World War II. In the bubble, prices reached a multiple of 26. In 2008, prices had fallen to a multiple of 22.

In some areas houses were selling at multiples of replacement costs, especially when prices were correctly adjusted for depreciation. Cost per square foot indexes still show wide variability from city to city, therefore it may be that new houses can be built more cheaply in some areas than asking prices for existing homes.

Possible factors of this variation from city to city are housing supply constraints, both regulatory and geographical. Regulatory constraints such as urban growth boundaries serve to reduce the amount of developable land and thus increase prices for new housing construction. Geographic constraints (water bodies, wetlands, and slopes) cannot be ignored either. It is debatable which type of constraint contributes more to price fluctuations. Some argue that the latter, by inherently increasing the value of land in a defined area (because the amount of usable land is less), give homeowners and developers incentive to support regulations to further protect the value of their property.

In this case, geographical constraints beget regulatory action. To the contrary, others will argue that geographic constraints are only a secondary factor, pointing to the more discernable effects that urban growth boundaries have on housing prices in such places as Portland, OR. Despite the presence of geographic constraints in the surrounding Portland area, their current urban growth boundary does not encompass those areas. Therefore, one would argue, such geographic constraints are a non issue.

=== Dot-com bubble collapse ===
Yale economist Robert Shiller argues that the 2000 stock market crash displaced "irrational exuberance" from the fallen stock market to residential real estate: "Once stocks fell, real estate became the primary outlet for the speculative frenzy that the stock market had unleashed."

The crash of the dot-com and technology sectors in 2000 led to a (approximately) 70% drop in the NASDAQ composite index. Shiller and several other economists have argued this resulted in many people taking their money out of the stock market and purchasing real estate, believing it to be a more reliable investment.

== Risky mortgage products and lax lending standards ==
Common indexes used for Adjustable Rate Mortgages (1996–2006).

Excessive consumer housing debt was in turn caused by the mortgage-backed security, credit default swap, and collateralized debt obligation sub-sectors of the finance industry, which were offering irrationally low interest rates and irrationally high levels of approval to subprime mortgage consumers because they were calculating aggregate risk using gaussian copula formulas that strictly assumed the independence of individual component mortgages, when in fact the credit-worthiness almost every new subprime mortgage was highly correlated with that of any other because of linkages through consumer spending levels which fell sharply when property values began to fall during the initial wave of mortgage defaults. Debt consumers were acting in their rational self-interest, because they were unable to audit the finance industry's opaque faulty risk pricing methodology.

=== Expansion of subprime lending ===
Low interest rates, high home prices, and flipping (or reselling homes to make a profit), effectively created an almost risk-free environment for lenders because risky or defaulted loans could be paid back by flipping homes.

Private lenders pushed subprime mortgages to capitalize on this, aided by greater market power for mortgage originators and less market power for mortgage securitizers. Subprime mortgages amounted to $35 billion (5% of total originations) in 1994, 9% in 1996, $160 billion (13%) in 1999, and $600 billion (20%) in 2006.

=== Risky products ===
The recent use of subprime mortgages, adjustable rate mortgages, interest-only mortgages, Credit default swaps, Collateralized debt obligations, Frozen credit markets and stated income loans (a subset of "Alt-A" loans, where the borrower did not have to provide documentation to substantiate the income stated on the application; these loans were also called "no doc" (no documentation) loans and, somewhat pejoratively, as "liar loans") to finance home purchases described above have raised concerns about the quality of these loans should interest rates rise again or the borrower is unable to pay the mortgage.

In many areas, particularly in those with most appreciation, non-standard loans went from almost unheard of to prevalent. For example, 80% of all mortgages initiated in San Diego region in 2004 were adjustable-rate, and 47% were interest only.

In 1995, Fannie Mae and Freddie Mac began receiving affordable housing credit for buying Alt-A securities Academic opinion is divided on how much this contributed to GSE purchases of nonprime MBS and to growth of nonprime mortgage origination.

Some borrowers got around downpayment requirements by using seller-funded downpayment assistance programs (DPA), in which a seller gives money to a charitable organizations that then give the money to them. From 2000 through 2006, more than 650,000 buyers got their down payments through nonprofits. According to a Government Accountability Office study, there are higher default and foreclosure rates for these mortgages. The study also showed that sellers inflated home prices to recoup their contributions to the nonprofits.

On May 4, 2006, the IRS ruled that such plans are no longer eligible for non-profit status due to the circular nature of the cash flow, in which the seller pays the charity a "fee" after closing. On October 31, 2007, the Department of Housing and Urban Development adopted new regulations banning so-called "seller-funded" downpayment programs. Most must cease providing grants on FHA loans immediately; one can operate until March 31, 2008.

Mortgage standards became lax because of a moral hazard, where each link in the mortgage chain collected profits while believing it was passing on risk. Mortgage denial rates for conventional home purchase loans, reported under the Home Mortgage Disclosure Act, have dropped noticeably, from 29 percent in 1998, to 14 percent in 2002 and 2003. Traditional gatekeepers such as mortgage securitizers and credit rating agencies lost their ability to maintain high standards because of competitive pressures.

Mortgage risks were underestimated by every institution in the chain from originator to investor by underweighting the possibility of falling housing prices given historical trends of rising prices. These authors argue that misplaced confidence in innovation and excessive optimism led to miscalculations by both public and private institutions.

In March 2007, the United States' subprime mortgage industry collapsed due to higher-than-expected home foreclosure rates, with more than 25 subprime lenders declaring bankruptcy, announcing significant losses, or putting themselves up for sale. Harper's Magazine warned of the danger of rising interest rates for recent homebuyers holding such mortgages, as well as the U.S. economy as a whole: "The problem [is] that prices are falling even as the buyers' total mortgage remains the same or even increases. ... Rising debt-service payments will further divert income from new consumer spending. Taken together, these factors will further shrink the "real" economy, drive down those already declining real wages, and push our debt-ridden economy into Japan-style stagnation or worse."

Factors that could contribute to rising rates are the U.S. national debt, inflationary pressure caused by such factors as increased fuel and housing costs, and changes in foreign investments in the U.S. economy. The Fed raised rates 17 times, increasing them from 1% to 5.25%, between 2004 and 2006. BusinessWeek magazine called the option ARM (which might permit a minimum monthly payment less than an interest-only payment) "the riskiest and most complicated home loan product ever created" and warned that over one million borrowers took out $466 billion in option ARMs in 2004 through the second quarter of 2006, citing concerns that these financial products could hurt individual borrowers the most and "worsen the [housing] bust".

To address the problems arising from "liar loans", the Internal Revenue Service updated an income verification tool used by lenders to make confirmation of borrower's claimed income faster and easier. In April 2007, financial problems similar to the subprime mortgages began to appear with Alt-A loans made to homeowners who were thought to be less risky; the delinquency rate for Alt-A mortgages rose in 2007. The manager of the world's largest bond fund PIMCO, warned in June 2007 that the subprime mortgage crisis was not an isolated event and will eventually take a toll on the economy and whose ultimate impact will be on the impaired prices of homes.

== See also ==
- Resolution Trust Corporation
- Savings and loan crisis
