= Ernest Garcia III =

American businessman

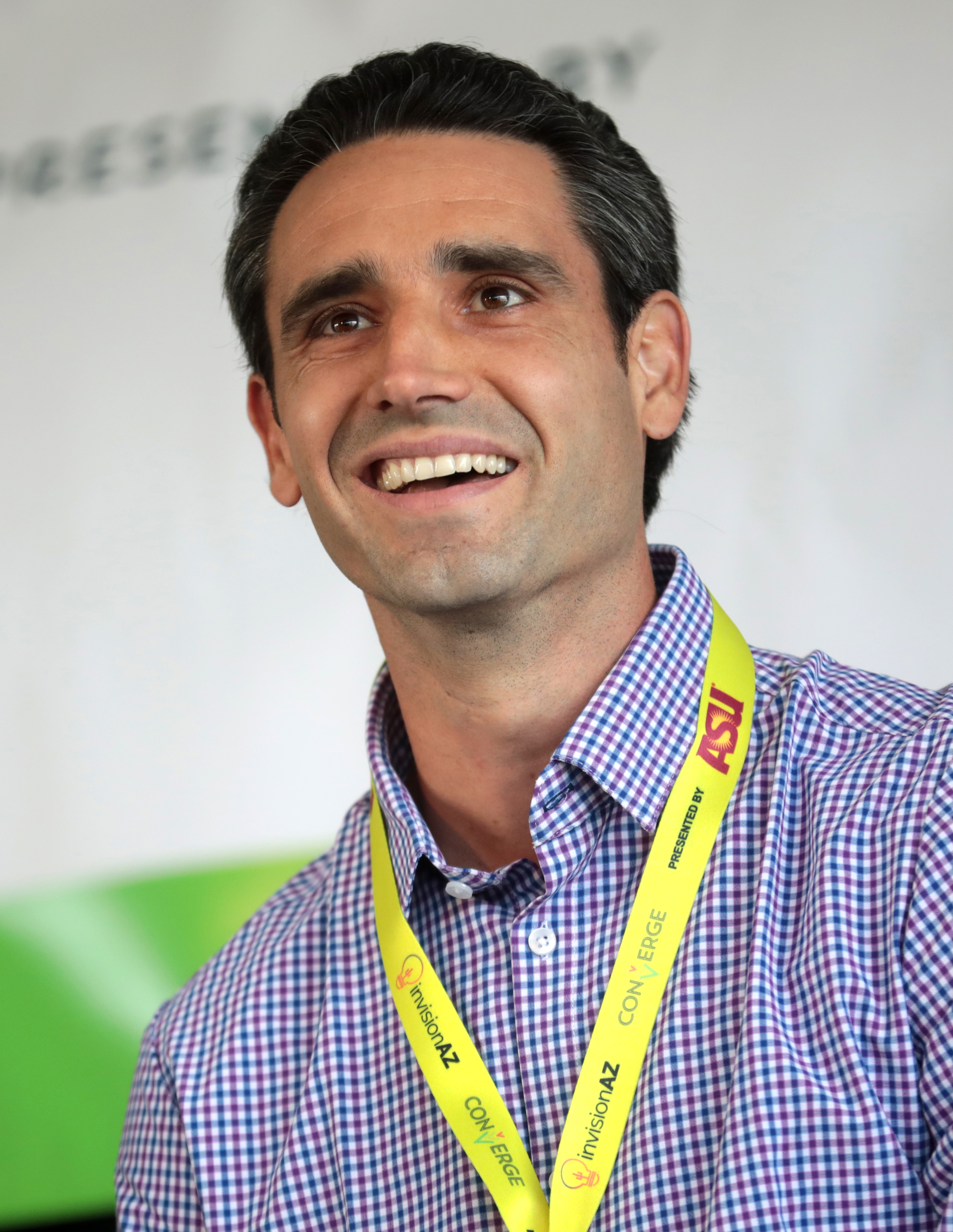
- Garcia III in 2020
- Born: Ernest C. Garcia; 1982 or 1983 (age 42–43)
- Education: Stanford University
- Occupation: Businessman
- Known for: Chairman and CEO, Carvana
- Parent: Ernest Garcia II

Ernest C. Garcia III (born 1982/1983) is an American businessman. He is the co-founder and chief executive officer of online used car retailer Carvana.

== Early life, education and family ==
Ernest Garcia III is the son of businessman Ernest Garcia II. He earned a bachelor's degree in Management Science and Engineering from Stanford University in 2005. Garcia lives in Phoenix, Arizona.

== Career ==
Garcia began his career as an associate in the Principal Transactions Group at RBS Greenwich Capital. He joined DriveTime in 2007, before co-founding (with Ryan Keeton and Ben Huston) its subsidiary Carvana in 2012, with Garcia as president and CEO since its inception. Carvana was eventually spun out from DriveTime and given an IPO in 2017. At that time, Garcia became chairman of Carvana.

In 2016, Garcia was named Ernst & Young Entrepreneur Of The Year in the Mountain Desert region for the consumer technology category Garcia, along with Carvana's co-founders, were included in Fortune's 40 Under 40 list in 2017.

According to the Bloomberg Billionaires Index, Garcia's wealth dropped 98% in 2022, as Carvana's stock price continued to fall amid bankruptcy concerns.
