= Ernest Garcia II =

American businessman

Ernest García
- Born: May 1, 1957 (age 69)
- Education: University of Arizona (BA)
- Known for: Chairman and owner, DriveTime
- Children: Ernest Garcia III

Ernest García II (born May 1, 1957) is an American billionaire businessman, the owner of DriveTime, and a major shareholder in Carvana. In 1990, he pleaded guilty to a felony bank fraud charge for his role in the Lincoln Savings and Loan Association collapse. As of May 2026, his net worth was estimated at US$23.9 billion.

== Early life ==
Ernest García II was born May 1, 1957, the son of Ernest Garcia, who co-owned a liquor store with Frank Colaianni, and was once the mayor of Gallup, New Mexico. He dropped out, but eventually earned a bachelor's degree from the University of Arizona.

== Career ==
In October 1990, García, then a Tucson-based real estate developer pleaded guilty to a felony bank fraud charge for his role as a straw borrower in the collapse of Charles Keating's Lincoln Savings and Loan Association. Garcia "fraudulently obtained a $30-million line of credit in a series of transactions that also helped Lincoln hide its ownership in risky desert Arizona land from regulators." Garcia spent three years on probation, and he and his firm filed for bankruptcy.

In 1991, García bought Ugly Duckling, a bankrupt rent-a-car franchise, for under $1 million and merged it with his own fledgling finance company, and turned it into a company selling and financing used cars for sub-prime buyers with poor credit history. Garcia took the company public on the NASDAQ exchange in 1996, trading under the ticker "UGLY". In 1999, Garcia was involved in six lawsuits alleging he had "abused his position to profit" from a real estate deal where he ultimately acquired 17 company properties at a 10% discount. In 2002, Garcia and the former Ugly Duckling CEO, Gregory Sullivan, took the company private and renamed it DriveTime.

As of April 2021, García's net worth is estimated at $15.9 billion.

It was announced in September 2021 that Garcia had sold more than $3.6 billion of Carvana stock since the previous October, which amounted to 16% of his holdings in the company.

== Personal life ==
He is married, and lives in Tempe, Arizona. His son, Ernest Garcia III, is CEO of Carvana.

Garcia owns an apartment in New York's Trump Tower.
