= Carvana =

Used car e-commerce company based in Arizona, United States

Carvana Co.

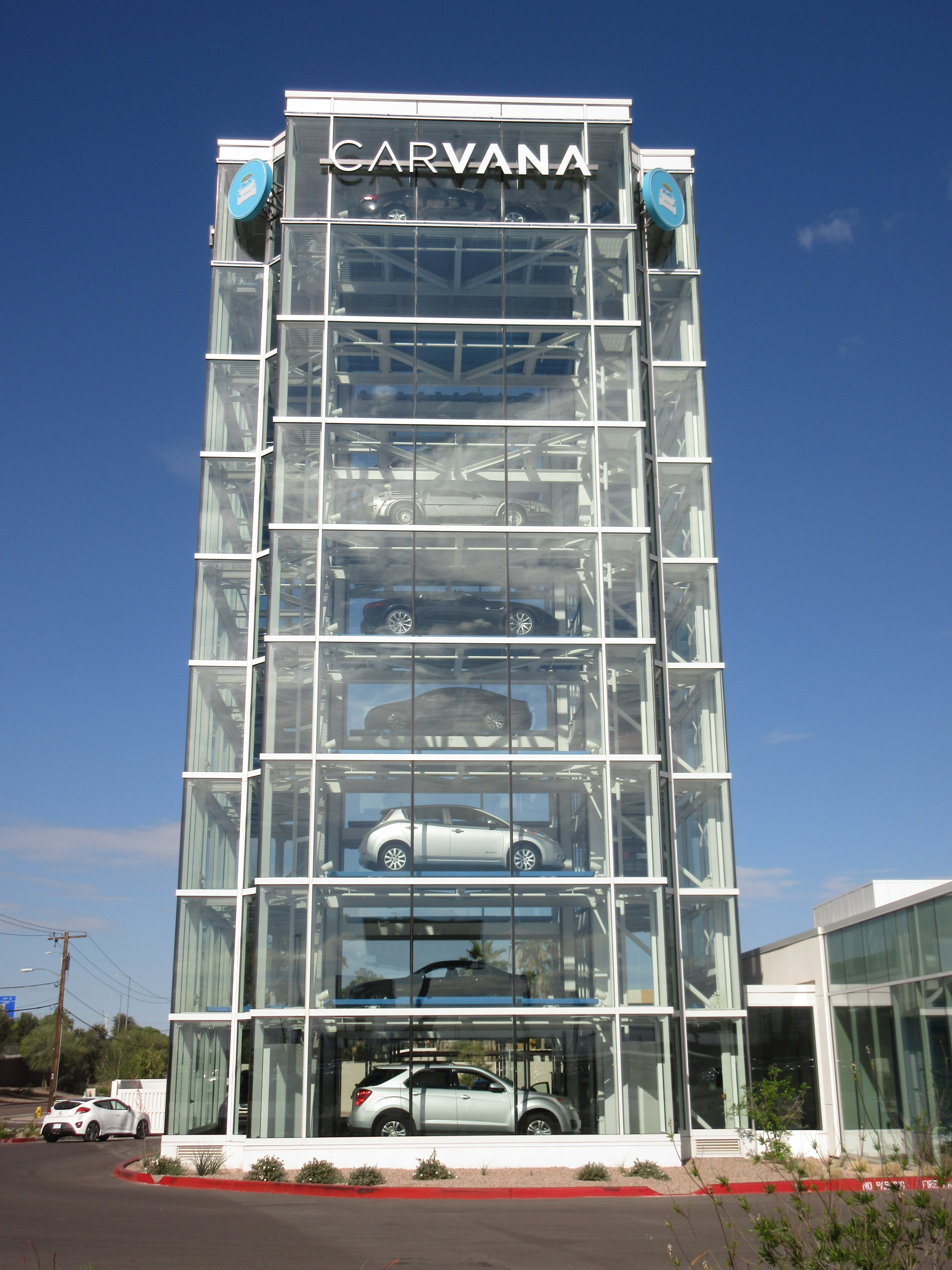
- One of the 39 car vending machines across the United States
- Type: Public
- Traded as: NYSE: CVNA (Class A); S&P 500 component
- Industry: E-commerce
- Founded: 2012; 14 years ago
- Founders: Ernest Garcia III; Ryan Keeton; Ben Huston
- Headquarters: Tempe, Arizona, U.S.
- Area served: United States
- Key people: Ernest Garcia III (chairman & CEO); Dan Gill (CPO)
- Products: New and used cars
- Revenue: ▲US$20.3 billion (2025)
- Operating income: ▲US$1.88 billion (2025)
- Net income: ▲US$1.41 billion (2025)
- Total assets: ▲US$13.2 billion (2025)
- Total equity: ▲US$3.44 billion (2025)
- Number of employees: 23,100 (2025)
- Website: carvana.com

Carvana Co. is an American online car retailer based in Tempe, Arizona. Carvana was named to the 2021 Fortune 500 list, one of the youngest companies to be added to the list.

== History ==
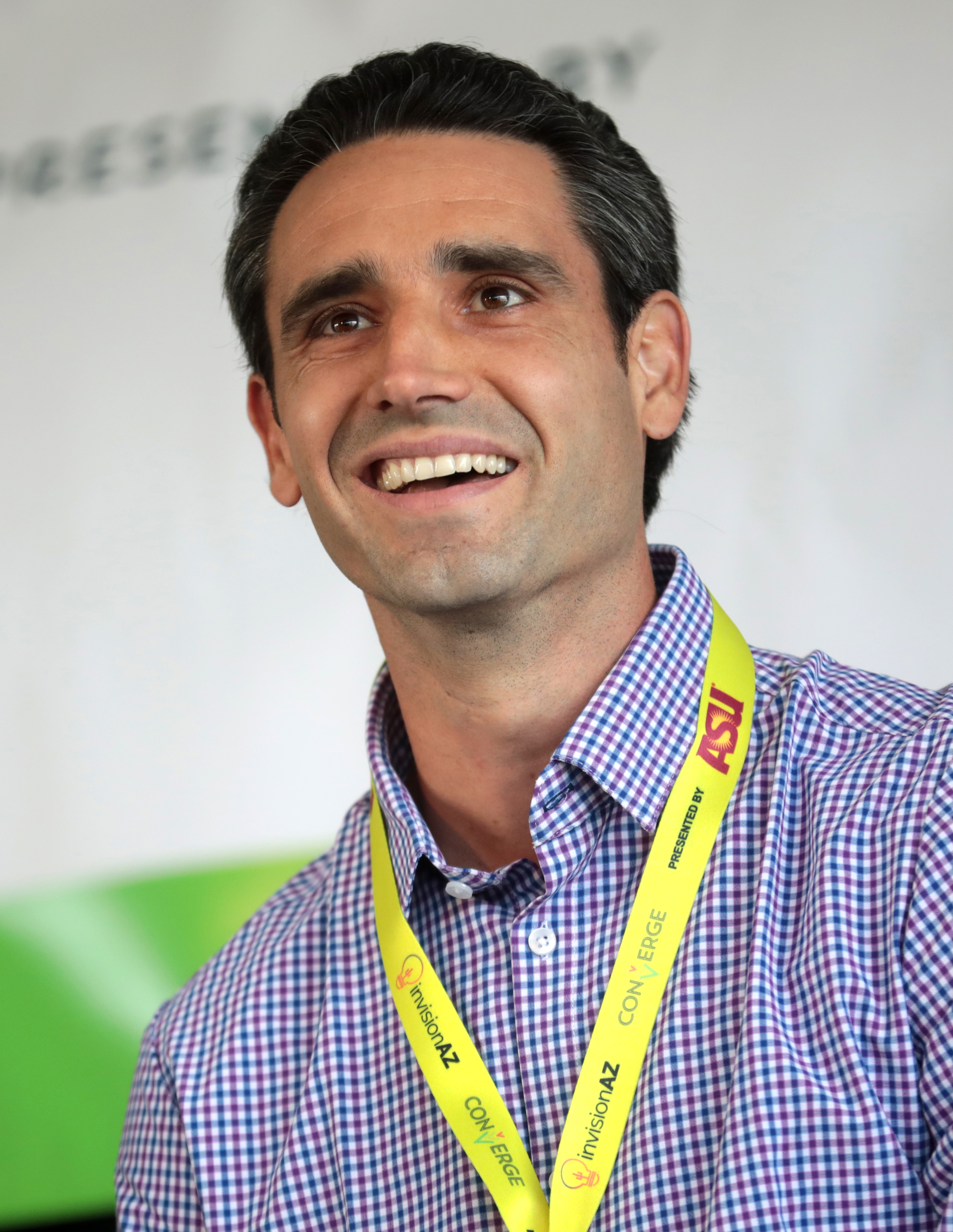
Ernest Garcia III, CEO and co-founder of Carvana

Carvana was founded by Ernest Garcia III, Ryan Keeton and Ben Huston in 2012. The company's initial funding round came from the used car retailer and finance company DriveTime. A year later Carvana opened its first iteration of a car vending machine. In 2015, a fully automated, commemorative coin-operated version of the signature car vending machine opened in Nashville, Tennessee. Carvana currently operates over 30 vehicle vending machines in the US.

In April 2017, the company went public and began trading on the New York Stock Exchange under the symbol CVNA. Also in the same year Carvana acquired rival automotive startup Calypso and in this same year Carvana's co-founders were included in Fortune’s 40 Under 40 list in 2017. The following year Carvana spent $22 million to acquire Mark Cuban-backed Car360 for its smartphone technology for taking vehicle photos with 3D computer vision, machine learning, and augmented reality. In 2022, Carvana acquired ADESA, the nation’s second-largest wholesale auto auction chain, for $2.2 billion to increase its real estate footprint.

Carvana began offering touchless delivery and pick-up in March 2020 during the COVID-19 pandemic. In Q2 for that year, the company reported a 25% increase in vehicle sales, as a result of physical dealership sellers being closed as a consequence of the COVID-19 pandemic. Carvana had a gross revenue of $1.12 billion, up 13% for April–June 2020. Throughout that year Carvana sold 244,111 vehicles and posted annual revenue of $5.587 billion, making it the second largest online used-car retailer in the U.S. As of November 2023, Carvana's as-soon-as-next-day delivery was available in 300+ markets nationwide. During the COVID-19 pandemic, Carvana's market value increased when consumers turned to vehicle online marketplaces.

In August 2023, Carvana introduced same-day delivery for customers purchasing or selling a vehicle, the service is currently available in Alabama, Arizona, Indiana, North Carolina, Georgia, Dallas-Fort Worth, and Central Florida.

In May 2022, The Wall Street Journal reported that Carvana had to lay off 12% of its staff (2,500 employees) after falling short of growth expectations. Carvana stock was 90% off its 52-week stock price as interest in the company collapsed. On November 4, 2022, Carvana's stock price dropped around 40% following its poor third-quarter financial results. The total number of used vehicles sold declined by 8% to 102,570. Analysts blamed rising borrowing costs and elevated used-car prices.

In February 2024, CNBC reported Carvana had spent the last 18 months restructuring its operations and debt given concerns about potential bankruptcy. As part of the shift from growth to cost cutting, the company lowered its headcount by more than 4,000 people, removed $1.1 billion of annualized expenses out of operations; released a new proprietary software called Carli that would allow for end-to-end processing of vehicle reconditioning and other tasks that were previously manual; built specific tools for inbound and outbound logistics activities like mapping, route optimization, and driver schedule management; and introducing new tools that employed generative AI for some tasks.

The company moved into the new car market in 2025.

== Regulatory history ==
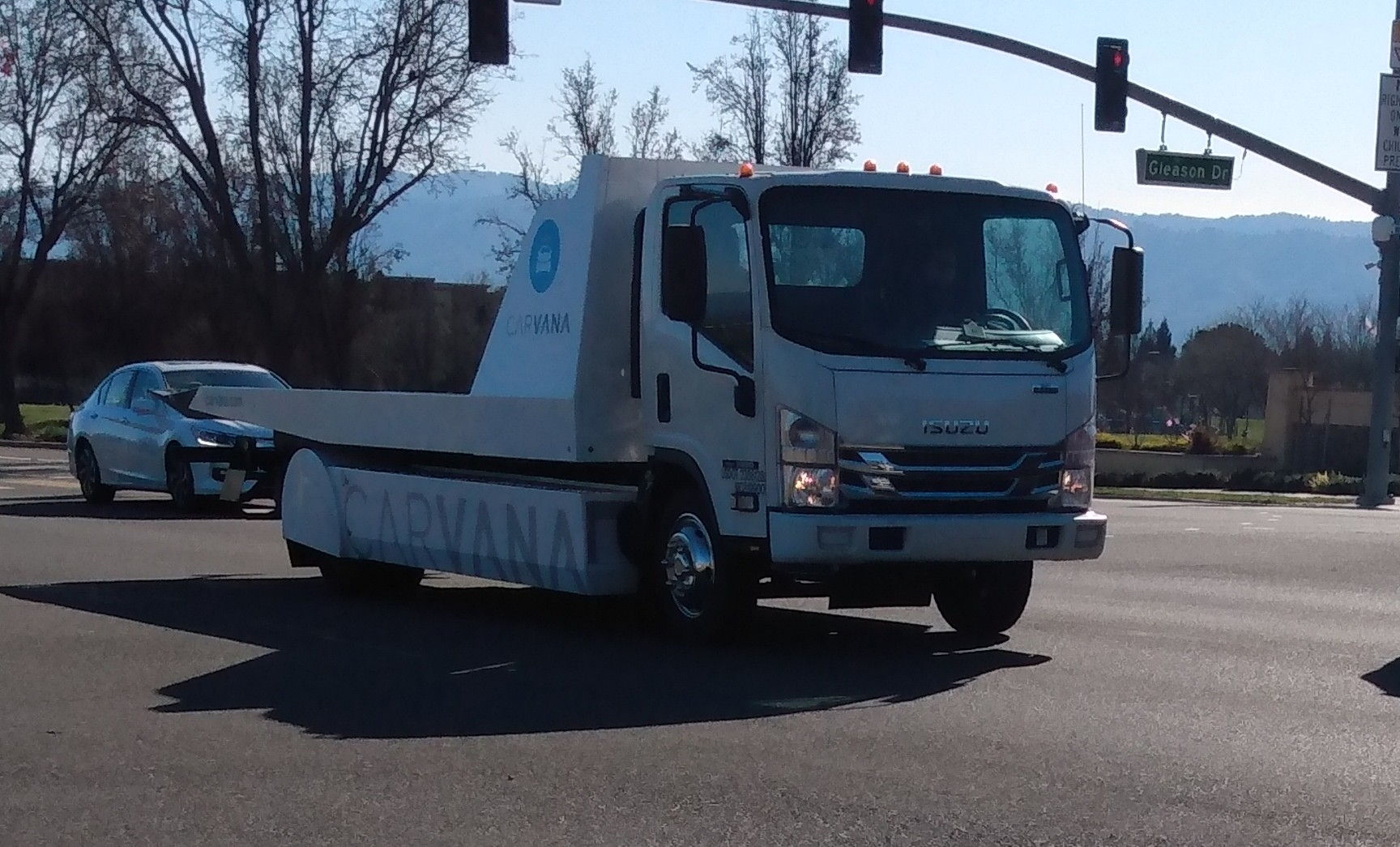
Vehicles not picked up at the vending machine are delivered by a flatbed truck

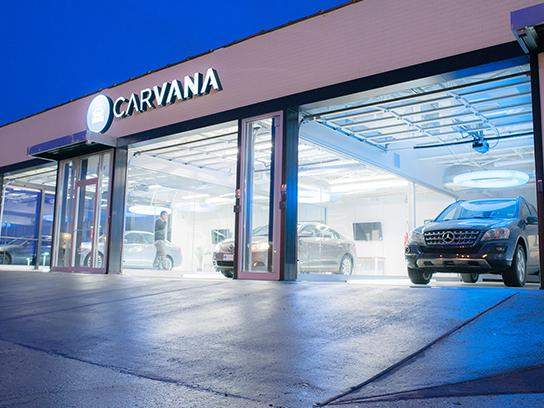
Outside of the Atlanta car vending machine

In August 2021, Carvana's Raleigh vending machine was issued a temporary ban by regulators in North Carolina due to its failure to properly conduct inspections and provide vehicle titles to customers as required by state law. Carvana continued business in Raleigh from other sites in the area and the vending machine was allowed to resume business in January 2022.

For two weeks from May 10, 2022 through May 25, 2022, Illinois suspended Carvana's business license due to customer complaints, effectively banning the company from conducting business in the state. The Office of the Secretary of State of Illinois stated that the company had failed to provide titles to buyers for the vehicles they had purchased within 20 days, as required by Illinois law, and in some cases had illegally issued temporary registrations from other states to customers in Illinois. The state lifted the suspension on May 26, 2022, after imposing strict guidelines on the company's operations. On July 18, 2022, the Secretary of State's office announced that Carvana's suspension was reimposed after finding that company continued to engage in illegal conduct. Paul Breaux, Vice President for Carvana, was charged with multiple misdemeanor and petty offenses due to the Illinois issues. On July 29, 2022, Carvana won a temporary injunction against Illinois to resume business in the state and the Illinois Secretary of State was banned from 'suspending or revoking' the company’s certificates of authority and dealer plates.

Similar issues have been faced in other states, including Pennsylvania, where a class action lawsuit has been filed alleging that the company violated the state's Unfair and Deceptive Trade Practices Act by failing to properly transfer ownership to buyers, a matter in which Carvana denies any liability.

On October 7, 2022, the Michigan Secretary of State suspended the license for the Carvana dealership in Novi for "immediate harm to the public" due to violations of the Michigan Vehicle Code. Before the October 2022 suspension, the state had conducted an investigation in February 2021 that led to Carvana agreeing to be placed under probation in May 2021 and admitting violations. Additional violations occurred during the probation period, and Carvana agreed to a six-month extension of the probation period in February 2022. Despite the suspension, the Novi location continued to operate the following week.

== Controversy ==
=== Hindenburg Research report (2025) ===
In January 2025, short-selling investment firm Hindenburg Research published a report titled "Carvana: A Father-Son Accounting Grift For The Ages," in which it disclosed a short position against the company. The report alleged that Carvana's financial turnaround was a "mirage" propped up by accounting manipulation and lax loan underwriting. The report focused on deals between Carvana and DriveTime, a private dealership owned by Ernest Garcia II, father of Carvana CEO Ernest Garcia III. It alleged these transactions were structured favorably to Carvana, allowing it to inflate revenue and profitability. A former director quoted in the report likened the relationship to "Fight Club," stating, "there's certain things we don't talk about, and we don't talk about DriveTime".

Hindenburg also alleged that Carvana sold $800 million in auto loans in 2024 to a "suspected undisclosed related party," later identified as likely a trust affiliated with Cerberus Capital Management, Cerberus's Chairman of Global Investments, Dan Quayle, former vice president and a Carvana director. The report also cited former employees who described virtually non-existent underwriting standards and claimed 60-day delinquency rates were more than four times the industry norm.

The report alleged accounting practices that inflated key metrics like gross profit per unit and allowed income to be shifted between quarters. It also noted that Ernest Garcia II sold over $3.6 billion in Carvana stock between 2020 and 2021, and another $1.4 billion following a 2023 stock rally.

== Securities fraud lawsuit ==
A class-action securities fraud lawsuit is proceeding against Carvana, its founders, executives, and underwriters in the United States District Court for the District of Arizona. As of February 2025, the court has denied the defendants' motions to dismiss and a subsequent motion for reconsideration, allowing the case to proceed to discovery. The suit claims that when this "scheme" could no longer be concealed, a series of partial disclosures caused the company's stock price to decline, resulting in investor losses. The plaintiffs in the case are led by the United Association National Pension Fund and the Saskatchewan Healthcare Employees' Pension Plan.

== Sponsorships ==
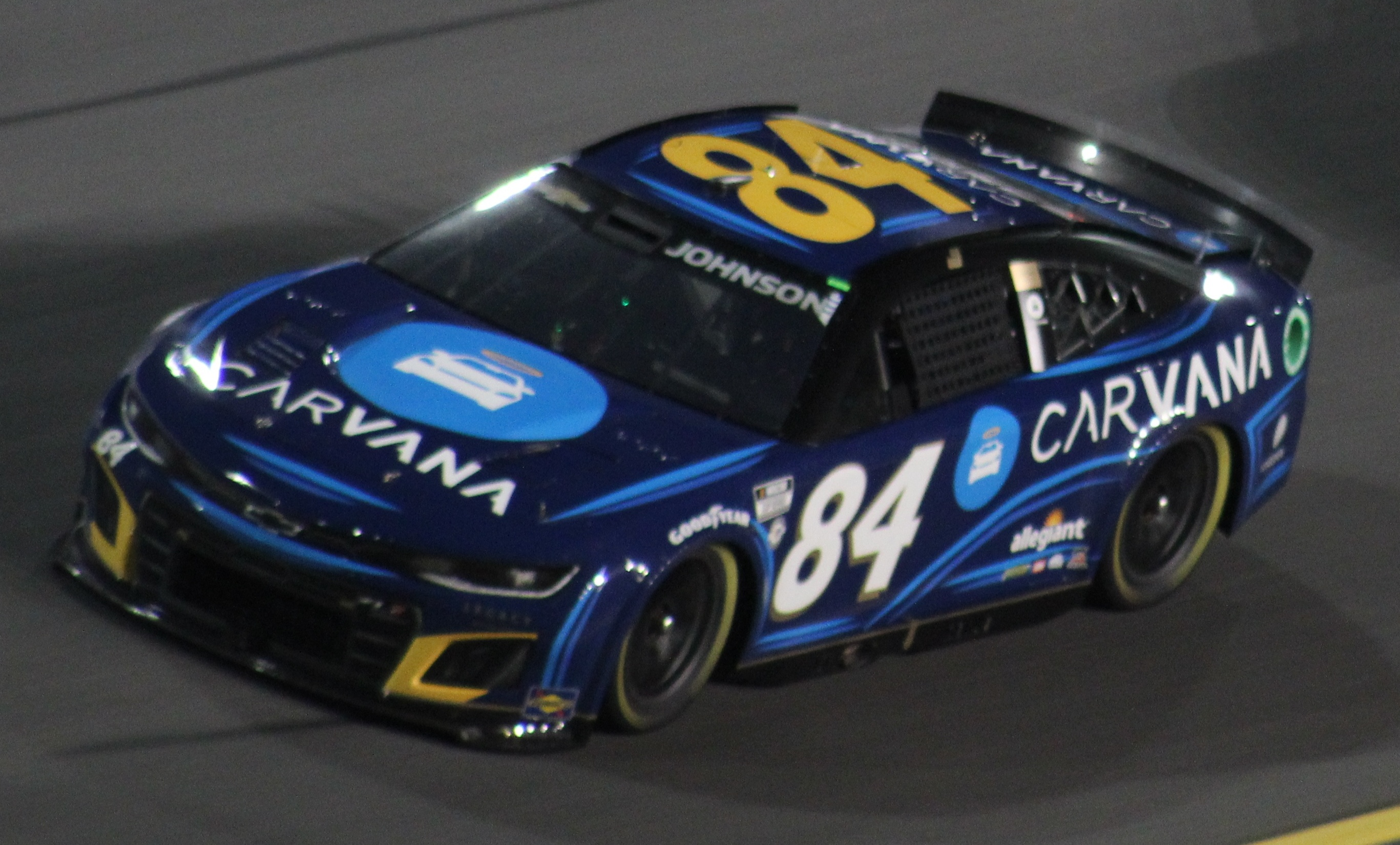
The Carvana-sponsored No. 84 car, driven by Jimmie Johnson

=== Soccer ===
In 2018, Tri Nguyen's son, Alex Nguyen, suggested that Carvana should become the main jersey sponsor of the USL Championship's Phoenix Rising FC. It happened. The club and company agreed to extend their partnership in December 2023. As part of the expanded agreement, Carvana also became a main sponsor of the club's youth soccer programs.

In December 2023, Carvana announced its kit sponsorship for Chicago Fire FC of Major League Soccer (MLS).

In January 2025, Carvana entered into a sponsorship agreement with Rush Soccer that included placing the Carvana logo on the front of all game jerseys.

=== Other ===
Carvana has been a sponsor of seven-time NASCAR Cup Series champion driver Jimmie Johnson since 2021. The relationship began with Carvana appearing on his No. 48 car in the IndyCar Series. When Johnson returned to NASCAR in 2023, Carvana followed suit as the primary sponsor on his No. 84. The company has also backed Johnson's other racing endeavors like his truck in the 2026 Mint 400.

It has been the title sponsor of the Professional Pickleball Association Tour since 2022.

In November 2025, Carvana became the official auto retailer of Stanford Athletics.
