= Poverty–industrial complex =

Privatization of social services

The poverty industrial complex refers to private corporations taking over social services functions that were formerly provided by government agencies. These private corporations have a vested interest in profit and it is thus debated whether the practice of privatizing social services is hurtful to society, in particular for the poor and vulnerable people that such agencies are supposed to provide services for.

== History ==
It is believed that the widespread outsourcing of human services formerly provided by government agencies to for-profit companies began with the Personal Responsibility and Work Opportunity Act, signed by president Bill Clinton in 1996. The reform changed a system that formerly provided large sums of direct cash transfers to those in need into taking that federal aid in providing services for vulnerable citizens with it. Those services include child care assistance or work-related activities and refundable tax credits that are essentially a different form of cash transfer. According to the Institute for Research on Poverty, the largest sum is going to a spending category designated as "other", covering a broad range of services such as child welfare, parenting training, substance abuse treatment, domestic violence services and early education. Author Daniel Hatcher criticized that a poverty iron triangle has developed between the federal government, state governments and poverty-industry private contractors. Funds provided by the federal government to help vulnerable populations are misused and funneled towards private companies and in addition to that used by the states, which often have a tight budget, as a mere revenue stream.

== Contemporary poverty–industrial complex ==
The United States Department of Health and Human Services (HHS) is an executive department that provides poverty assistance, with an annual budget of around US$1.2 trillion. One major branch of the HHS is the Office of Community Service (OCS). The OCS provides funds to states, counties and cities that are intended to lift people out of poverty.

Daniel Hatcher, author of The Poverty Industry: The Exploitation of America’s Most Vulnerable Citizens, has compared the practice of for-profit companies taking over government functions deemed for the most vulnerable in society as a huge "poverty industrial complex", thus comparing it to the military industrial complex. According to Hatcher, human service agencies and private companies conspire to create a large poverty industry in which billions in federal aid meant to go towards helping the poorest of society is instead taken by private companies. As a result, services provided to those in need become inadequate.

Among the private companies providing these services are those known for integral roles in the United States defense industry – like Lockheed Martin and Northrop Grumman. These companies provide services like child support, Medicaid services, health insurance call centers and welfare-to-work programs. As for-profit companies, they turn to consultants that help them figure out how to maximize their bottom line. The company Maximus Inc. for example states in advertisements that it has partnered with state, federal and local governments to help provide high-quality health and human service programs in "cost-effective" ways tailored to each community. The company has been in contract with government agencies in different states where it was accused of not paying overtime to employees or not allowing them to work overtime, thus rendering it impossible to respond to emergency situations. Additionally Maximus was accused of misclassifying employees and underpaying employees. Maximus received the nation's first privatized welfare contract in 1987 from Los Angeles County and by 1990 was generating $19 million in revenue, Mother Jones reported in 2019. Maximus has partnered with agencies in 28 US states for 1.7 billion US dollars in services. 40% of the total revenue of the company is generated through state contracts to provide government services.

=== The Trials of Gabriel Fernandez ===
The term was mentioned in the 2020 Netflix series The Trials of Gabriel Fernandez, which surrounds the failure of social services and law enforcement to rescue Fernandez from an abusive home. Fernandez's parents tortured the child to death, gaining widespread attention and critique of the child welfare system in the United States. The Netflix series mentions in particular the for-profit company Maximus, which has taken over social service functions formerly handled by government agencies in Los Angeles County.

=== Poverty Inc. ===
The 2014 documentary Poverty Inc. explored the poverty-industrial complex as a multi-billion dollar market of NGOs, multilateral agencies, and for-profit aid contractors turning the most vulnerable members of society into profit generators and misappropriating funds.

== See also ==
- List of industrial complexes
- Poverty industry
