= 5-6 moneylending =

Informal lending practice in the Philippines

Occupation
- Names: Five-Six Moneylenders, Bombay 5-6
- Pronunciation: Five Six
- Activity sectors: Informal economy

Description
- Related jobs: loan

Bombay 5-6, also known as simply 5-6 (pronounced "five six"), is an informal financial platform in the Philippines. Lenders do not require collateral, including documents, to potential borrowers.

The Bombay 5-6 moneylending system is an informal lending practice prevalent in the Philippines, historically associated with small-scale, short-term loans provided by Indian-Filipino lenders, often colloquially called "Bombay". This system is named "5-6" due to its interest structure: for every PHP 5 borrowed, borrowers repay PHP 6, signifying a 20% interest rate. The system is notable for its high accessibility and absence of stringent documentation, as lenders usually offer loans directly in markets or neighborhoods and conduct daily or weekly collections in person.

== History ==
The 5-6 moneylending tradition likely dates back to the early 20th century when Indian immigrants arrived in the Philippines, particularly from the Punjab region. Many became informal lenders to provide easy access to cash for small business owners, market vendors, and individuals who lacked access to formal financial services. This method of lending evolved to fill a financial gap, particularly among micro-entrepreneurs needing quick capital for inventory or small expenses.

Through the Filipino Lending Company Regulation Act of 2007 (Republic Act No. 9474) and the Truth in Lending Act (Republic Act No. 3765), the 5-6 moneylending practice is generally considered illegal due to regulations, usurious interest rates, and undocumented activities.

== Key features of the 5-6 system ==
The 5-6 system remains a topic of debate in the Philippines, balancing between its perceived exploitative nature and the role it plays in providing accessible capital for low-income earners and small businesses.

- High accessibility: Loans are easy to obtain without formal requirements like credit checks, collateral, or lengthy paperwork, making them attractive for individuals without access to banks.
- Interest rate: The standard 20% interest rate over short periods can make repayment challenging, as the daily or weekly collection may strain borrowers’ cash flow.
- Reputation and risks: The high-interest rates have led to public criticism, often describing the practice as exploitative. However, supporters argue that 5-6 fills a critical role by offering credit where traditional financial institutions are unavailable or inaccessible.

== Criticism ==
The Philippine government has campaigned against the informal 5-6 moneylending practice due to its high-interest rates, which place significant financial strain on low-income borrowers. Former President Rodrigo Duterte, during his administration, explicitly voiced concerns over 5-6 lending, calling it "predatory." In response, the Department of Trade and Industry (DTI) and other government agencies implemented initiatives aimed at providing alternative, low-interest loan options for small entrepreneurs, such as the Pondo sa Pagbabago at Pag-asenso (P3) program. This program offers affordable loans with interest rates considerably lower than those of the 5-6 system, thereby reducing reliance on informal moneylenders.

The Bangko Sentral ng Pilipinas (BSP), the country's central bank, has also engaged in financial literacy programs to educate citizens on the risks of high-interest lending and encourage formal banking services. By promoting more affordable lending options and raising awareness, the government has sought to curb the dependency on informal moneylending practices like 5-6 and provide a safer financial environment for micro-entrepreneurs.

== See also ==
- Loan shark
- Microfinance
- Payday lending
- Poverty industry
- Hawala
