= DriveTime =

American used car retailer

DriveTime Automotive Group, Inc.
- Type: Private
- Industry: Used car retailer
- Predecessor: Ugly Duckling
- Founded: September 1, 2002; 23 years ago (as DriveTime)
- Headquarters: 1720 W. Rio Salado Parkway, Tempe, Arizona, U.S.
- Number of locations: 138 (2019)
- Key people: Thomas S. Duck, Jr. Ernest Garcia II (Owner and chairman)
- Products: Used cars, financing
- Number of employees: 3,800 (2018)
- Website: drivetime.com

DriveTime Automotive Group Inc. is an American used car retailer and finance company. It is based in Tempe, Arizona, and sells and finances cars to customers around the nation. The company was formerly known as Ugly Duckling and was renamed DriveTime in 2002. It also spun off Carvana and GO Financial, SilverRock Group Inc, and Bridgecrest Acceptance Corporation. As of 2018, DriveTime had approximately 145 locations in the U.S. and 3,800 employees.

== Operations ==
DriveTime is a private company headquartered in Tempe, Arizona. The company's business model is focused on selling previously owned vehicles to car-buyers. It uses a proprietary credit scoring model to finance car purchases at its dealerships in-house, including subprime lending.

DriveTime buys 150,000 cars annually at various auctions. After auction, the company puts the purchased cars through a 14-day inspection at one of its 24 inspection centers. It makes necessary repairs before sending the vehicles to its dealerships. Approximately 8 percent of cars bought at auction do not pass the inspection process and are not sold through its dealerships.

The company is owned by its chairman, Ernest Garcia II, who bought the company then known as Ugly Duckling in 1991, and Ray Fidel, who is its former president and CEO. The company has approximately 138 locations in the U.S. and as of 2015, employs more than 3,800 workers. In addition to its headquarters in Tempe, the company has an operations call center in Mesa, Arizona and a collection center in Dallas, Texas.

It also encourages employees to create startup companies. Sister companies spun off from the company include GO Financial, Carvana and SilverRock Group.

DriveTime ranked 3,793 on the Inc. 5000 list of fastest growing companies after posting $2 billion in revenue and adding 1,192 jobs in 2014. DriveTime ranked No. 15 on Computerworld's 100 Best Places to Work in IT list in 2015.

== History ==
=== Ugly Duckling ===
DriveTime originated as a Tucson, Arizona–based rent-a-car business called Ugly Duckling, which was founded in 1977.

Thomas S. Duck, Sr., retired from selling insurance, started Ugly Duckling Rent-A-Car Corp. in 1977. By 1985, with the car rental business a major success and companies such as Budget Rent a Car doing well, Duck's company was the number five rental car company in the United States, with 600 franchises. Ultimately, Ugly Duckling filed for bankruptcy in 1989; Ernest Garcia II, who studied business at The University of Arizona in Tucson, and a convicted felon for his role as a straw borrower in the Lincoln Savings and Loan Association collapse, formed Duck Ventures, Inc. in 1990 and bought Ugly Duckling's assets. Later he started Ugly Duckling Holdings, Inc. and made Duck Ventures a subsidiary.

Ugly Duckling had two car dealers, one in Phoenix and one in Tucson, by 1992. The company bought three more dealers but added four new ones, giving them an appearance comparable to a standard dealer, rather than the unpleasant look most subprime lots had. One dealer closed in 1994 because it did not live up to the new image. Ugly Duckling also tried an experiment in Gilbert, Arizona, selling newer and more expensive cars, but ultimately sold that dealer in 1995.

In 1994, Ugly Duckling bought Champion Financial Services from Steve Darak, making Darak Chief Financial Officer. The company had a new source of income—buying installment contracts from other dealers, still considered subprime, but from customers more affluent than Ugly Duckling usually had.

Ugly Duckling arranged financing in several ways. The company prepared tax returns and let people use their expected refunds for down payments. The company allowed people to get Visa credit cards by paying a deposit to Visa. Also, those who made payments on time could have their down payment refunded, usually 10 to 15 percent of the purchase price. The dealers had repair service, and a buyer could obtain a repair contract. And unlike most car dealers, Ugly Duckling let customers make their payments with cash.

In 1996, Garcia took the company, then based out of Phoenix, Arizona, public on the NASDAQ exchange, where the company traded as "UGLY"; this raised $170 million for the business. By this time, the company had gained regional fame; William Gibson, an analyst for Cruttenden Roth, said in Investor's Business Daily in 1996, "You go to Tucson or Phoenix and people know The Duck. It's an icon in those cities."

Ugly Duckling began to exit the rental car business. 100 franchises closed by August 1996, and the other 40 would close over the next ten years as their contracts expired.

GE Capital increased its credit line to $100 million in 1996. With new financing sources, Ugly Duckling began a major expansion program. The company bought five dealers and $25 million in finance contracts from Seminole Capital Corporation in the Tampa/St. Petersburg area. For $26.3 million, Ugly Duckling bought some assets of E-Z Plan Inc. of San Antonio, Texas. It also opened its first dealers in Las Vegas, Nevada and opened two dealers in New Mexico. By August 1997, the company had 24 dealers in five states, and 64 branch offices in 17 states. Through the branches, Champion purchased financing contracts from 2710 dealers. Many of those contracts required casualty insurance; Ugly Duckling went into the insurance business, buying policies for those required to do so. Ugly Duckling's Drake Insurance Agency did this through American Bankers Insurance Group, and offered other types of insurance as well.

Another area of business was Cygnet Finance, Inc. which Ugly Duckling started in September 1996. This subsidiary offered financing for car dealers which could not.

Ugly Duckling became profitable and increased its number of employees from 652 at the start of 1997 to 1776 nine months later. A greater percentage of the company's income came from financing, and the November 11, 1996 issue of The Washington Post said Ugly Duckling was "a bank masquerading as a used-car lot."

By 1999, though, Ugly Duckling was out of the financing business; Garcia bought Cygnet and Champion closed. At the same time, Ugly Duckling was developing its own software, and CEO Gregory Sullivan said this company was the only one buying car dealers in 1999. Markets added included Orlando, Florida and Richmond, Virginia.

In 2001, sales were $541.7 million, and the headquarters moved to a former Mega Foods grocery. Ray Fidel, DriveTime's former president and chief executive, started working with Ugly Duckling in 2001 as it prepared to go private again.

=== DriveTime ===
Garcia owned 65 percent of Duckling by January 2002. That same year, Garcia and Sullivan bought out the remainder of the company's stock. Company officials renamed the newly private enterprise DriveTime effective September 1, 2002, with the registered name DriveTime Automotive Group intended to distinguish the auto seller from educational company Az Drive Time. The company operated 76 dealerships in eight states as DriveTime sought to expand across the U.S. O'Leary and Partners took over advertising in May 2003.

Prior to their involvement with DriveTime, Garcia and Fidel were known in connection with the Lincoln Savings and Loan Association scandal during the savings and loan crisis in the 1980s and 90s. Garcia pleaded guilty to a fraud charge in 1990. Fidel, Lincoln Savings and Loan's former president, pleaded guilty to securities fraud in 1991. Both men received sentences of three years probation. Federal judges credited them for pleading guilty and for helping to convict Charles Keating, who ran Lincoln Savings and Loan.

The company announced plans on November 2, 2004, to expand from 75 to 100 locations over two years, mostly in the Southwestern United States and in Florida, Georgia and Virginia. DriveTime employed 2,100 and revenues at the time were $729 million. Part of the company's success resulted from numerous job losses and bad credit, at a time when the American Bankruptcy Institute reported the highest bankruptcy rates ever, though by 2004 fewer people were filing for bankruptcy. As of 2004, chairman Garcia owned 85 percent of the company, the largest Latino-owned firm in Arizona.

In 2004, former president and CEO Ray Fidel said DriveTime intended to treat customers with financial problems the same as customers at premium auto dealers.

By 2005, DriveTime had added Austin, Texas and Norfolk, Virginia and planned sites in Charlotte, North Carolina and Nashville, Tennessee. As the company expanded, Auto Dealer Monthly and AutoTrader.com recognized Fidel as top independent retailer. By the end of 2006, DriveTime had more than 90 locations in nine states. The company opened its 100th DriveTime dealership in Concord, North Carolina, northeast of Charlotte, in 2007. The company also announced the completion of a new loan-servicing center in Mesa, Arizona, replacing one in Gilbert, Arizona, with 100 employees hired immediately and 300 more planned.

CarMax of Richmond, Virginia filed suit in United States District Court claiming DriveTime offered kickbacks to CarMax salespersons for each customer they referred to DriveTime, a violation of RICO. DriveTime general counsel Jon Ehlinger denied the accusation and said the company would "vociferously" fight to clear its name.

DriveTime encouraged its employees to develop new companies. In the early 2010s, it launched GO Financial. The new company began in 2011 as a DriveTime division, offering subprime retail financing, before becoming its own business. In 2013, DriveTime introduced Carvana as an e-commerce used car dealer run by Ernie Garcia Jr. in Phoenix.

The U.S. government's Consumer Financial Protection Bureau levied an $8 million civil penalty against DriveTime for its debt collection practices in November 2014. The agency alleged that DriveTime used abusive and illegal tactics, repeatedly called customers who were late with payments, including calls to customers' workplaces, and inaccurately reported them to credit bureaus. DriveTime was the first "buy here, pay here" business targeted by the Consumer Financial Protection Bureau, which was created in 2010 following the 2008 financial crisis. DriveTime agreed to pay the penalty and alter its collection process to comply with regulations. The agreement also included close supervision of DriveTime's collection and credit reporting by the Consumer Financial Protection Bureau for five years.

Based in Phoenix since its founding, DriveTime moved its company headquarters into a new 97,000-square-foot space in Tempe in November 2015. Carvana then moved into DriveTime's former Phoenix facility. Also in 2015, the company spun off a new sister company, SilverRock Group, offering insurance and warranty services.

By 2015, the number of car dealerships DriveTime owned surpassed 130 and by 2018, the company reached 145 dealerships across the nation.

In 2017, the company shifted its business model to focus on providing customers newer model vehicles with lower mileage.

== Spin-offs ==
=== Bridgecrest Acceptance Corporation ===
Launched in April 2016 by DriveTime, Bridgecrest services installment contracts for DriveTime and affiliated companies. With the spin off, Bridgecrest took over the more than 220,000 customers previously serviced by DriveTime Acceptance Corp.

=== Carvana ===
In 2013, DriveTime became the majority owner of Carvana; the two companies are operated completely separately. Carvana was founded in 2012 and launched nationwide in November 2013. The Phoenix-based company is an online used car retailer. Car-buyers use Carvana's website to view inventory, apply for financing and arrange pickup or delivery. The company has used car vending machines in major cities such as Atlanta, Georgia, and Nashville, Tennessee, where customers can pick up cars they bought online. The startup is able to tap into DriveTime's existing infrastructure, such as service facilities.

=== GO Financial ===
Go Financial is a financer of subprime loans. It is located in Mesa, Arizona. It was founded in 2011 and spun off as its own company in 2013. Cox Enterprises, which owns online marketplace AutoTrader.com and Kelley Blue Book, the car valuation and research company, bought a stake in GO Financial. It services 2,800 dealerships in 46 states.

Go Financial ceased originating new loans in May 2016

=== SilverRock Group ===
DriveTime spun off SilverRock Group in June 2015. The company sells auto insurance, vehicle service contracts and extended warranties. The company, based in Tempe, has approximately 185 employees.

== Major competitors ==
- AutoNation
- CarMax
