= Mortgage fraud =

Fraud relating to secured loans

Mortgage fraud refers to an intentional misstatement, misrepresentation, or omission of information relied upon by an underwriter or lender to fund, purchase, or insure a loan secured by real property.

Criminal offenses may be prosecuted in either federal or state court, and are typically charged under wire fraud, bank fraud, mail fraud, or money laundering statutes, with penalties of imprisonment for up to 30 years per offense. As the incidence of mortgage fraud has risen over the past few years, states have also begun to enact their own penalties for mortgage fraud.

Mortgage fraud is not to be confused with predatory mortgage lending, which occurs when a consumer is misled or deceived by agents of the lender. However, predatory lending practices often co-exist with mortgage fraud.

== Types ==
=== Occupancy fraud ===
This occurs where the borrower wishes to obtain a mortgage to acquire an investment property, but states on the loan application that the borrower will occupy the property as the primary residence or as a second home. If undetected, the borrower typically obtains a lower interest rate than was warranted.

Because lenders typically charge a higher interest rate for non-owner-occupied properties, which historically have higher delinquency rates, the lender receives insufficient return on capital and is over-exposed to loss relative to what was expected in the transaction.

In addition, lenders allow larger loans on owner-occupied homes compared to loans for investment properties. When occupancy fraud occurs, it is likely that taxes on gains are not paid, resulting in additional fraud. It is considered fraud because the borrower has materially misrepresented the risk to the lender to obtain more favorable loan terms.

A common mechanism used to detect or deter occupancy fraud is the "second home rider", a standard document signed at the closing in which the borrower agrees to occupy the property for their personal use and enjoyment for a specific period, typically at one year, unless the lender consents otherwise. Renting the property out during that period, rather than occupying it, can constitute a breach of the loan agreement and form the basis of a fraud allegation.

=== Income fraud ===
This occurs when a borrower overstates his/her income to qualify for a mortgage or for a larger loan amount. This was most often seen with so-called "stated income" mortgage loans (popularly referred to as "liar loans"), where the borrower, or a loan officer acting for a borrower with or without the borrower's knowledge, stated without verification the income needed to qualify for the loan. Because mortgage lenders today do not have "stated income" loans, income fraud is seen in traditional full-documentation loans where the borrower forges or alters an employer-issued Form W-2, tax returns and/or bank account records to provide support for the inflated income. All lenders obtain an official IRS transcript that must match the borrower provided tax returns. It is considered fraud because in most cases the borrower would not have qualified for the loan had the true income been disclosed. The "mortgage meltdown" was caused, in part, when large numbers of borrowers in areas of rapidly increasing home prices lied about their income, acquired homes they could not afford, and then defaulted. Many of the past problems no longer exist.

=== Employment fraud ===
This occurs when a borrower claims self-employment in a non-existent company or claims a higher position (e.g., manager) in a real company, to provide justification for a fraudulent representation of the borrower's income.

=== Failure to disclose liabilities ===
Borrowers may conceal obligations, such as mortgage loans on other properties or newly acquired credit card debt, to reduce the amount of monthly debt declared on the loan application. This omission of liabilities artificially lowers the debt-to-income ratio, which is a key underwriting criterion used to determine eligibility for most mortgage loans. It is considered fraud because it allows the borrower to qualify for a loan which otherwise would not have been granted, or to qualify for a bigger loan than what would have been granted had the borrower's true debt been disclosed.

=== Fraud for profit ===
Fraud for profit is a complex scheme involving multiple parties, including mortgage lending professionals, in a financially motivated attempt to defraud the lender of large sums of money. Fraud for profit schemes frequently include a straw borrower whose credit report is used, a dishonest appraiser who intentionally and significantly overstates the value of the subject property, a dishonest settlement agent who might prepare two sets of HUD settlement statements or makes disbursements from loan proceeds which are not disclosed on the settlement statement, and a property owner, all in a coordinated attempt to obtain an inappropriately large loan.

The parties involved share the ill-gotten gains and the mortgage eventually goes into default. In other cases, naive "investors" are lured into the scheme with the organizer's promise that the home will be repaired, repairs and/or renovations will be made, tenants will be located, rents will be collected, mortgage payments made and profits will be split upon sale of the property, all without the active participation of the straw buyer.

Once the loan is closed, the organizer disappears, no repairs are made nor renters found, and the "investor" is liable for paying the mortgage on a property that is not worth what is owed, leaving the "investor" financially ruined. If undetected, a bank may lend hundreds of thousands of dollars against a property that is actually worth far less and in large schemes with multiple transactions, banks may lend millions more than the properties are worth.

A detailed case study of the complex United States v. Quintero-Lopez case spans activity over 3 1/2 years (Bell, 2010).

=== Appraisal fraud ===
Occurs when a home's appraised value is deliberately overstated or understated. When overstated, more money can be obtained by the borrower in the form of a cash-out refinance, by the seller in a purchase transaction, or by the organizers of a for-profit mortgage fraud scheme. Appraisal fraud also includes cases where the home's value is deliberately understated to get a lower price on a foreclosed home, or in a fraudulent attempt to induce a lender to decrease the amount owed on the mortgage in a loan modification. A dishonest appraiser may be involved in the preparation of the fraudulent appraisal, or an existing and accurate appraisal may be altered by someone with knowledge of graphic editing tools such as Adobe Photoshop. Appraisal Independence is current law.

=== Cash-back schemes ===
Occur where the true price of a property is illegally inflated to provide cash-back to transaction participants, most often the borrowers, who receive a "rebate" which is not disclosed to the lender. As a result, the lender lends too much, and the buyer pockets the overage or splits it with other participants, including the seller or the real estate agent. This scheme requires appraisal fraud to deceive the lender. "Get Rich Quick" real-estate gurus' courses frequently rely heavily on this mechanism for profitability.

=== Shotgunning ===
Occurs when multiple loans for the same home are obtained simultaneously for a total amount that may be in excess of the actual value of the property. These schemes leave lenders exposed to large losses because the subsequent mortgages are junior to the first mortgage to be recorded and the property value is insufficient for the subsequent lenders to collect against the property in foreclosure. As a result of this fraud lenders may be required to litigate the issue of which lender has first priority to the property.

=== Working the gap ===
A technique which entails the excessive lien stacking knowingly executed on a specific property within an inordinately narrow timeframe, via the serial recording of multiple Deeds of Trust or Assignments of Note. When recording a legal document in the United States of America, a time gap exists between when the Deed of Trust is submitted to the recorder of deeds & when it actually shows up in the data. The precision timing technique of "working the gap" between the recording of a deed & its subsequent appearance in the recorder of deeds database is instrumental in propagating the perpetrator's deception. A title search done by any lender immediately prior to the respective loan, promissory note, & deed recording would thus erroneously fail to show the alternate liens concurrently in the queue. The goal of the perpetrator is the theft of funds from each lender by deceit, with all lenders simultaneously & erroneously believing their respective Deeds of Trust to be senior in position, when in actuality there can be only one. White-collar criminals who utilize this technique will frequently claim innocence based on clerical errors, bad record keeping, or other smokescreen excuses in an attempt to obfuscate the true coordination & intent inherent in this version of mortgage fraud. This "gaming" or exploitation of a structural weakness in the US legal system is a critical precursor to "shotgunning" and considered white-collar crime when implemented in a systemic fashion.

=== Identity theft ===
Occurs when a person assumes the identity of another and uses that identity to obtain a mortgage without the knowledge or consent of the victim. In these schemes, the thieves disappear without making payments on the mortgage. The schemes are usually not discovered until the lender tries to collect from the victim, who may incur substantial costs trying to prove the theft of his/her identity.

=== Falsification of loan applications without the knowledge of the borrower ===
The loan applications are falsified without the knowledge of the borrower when the borrower actually will not qualify for a loan for various reasons. for example parties involved will make a commission out of the transaction. The business happens only if the loan application is falsified. For example, borrower applies for a loan stating monthly income of $2000 (but with this income $2000 per month the borrower will not qualify), however the broker or loan officer falsified the income documents and loan application that borrower earns a monthly income of $15,000. The loan gets approved the broker/loan officer etc. gets their commission. But the borrower struggles to repay the loan and defaults the loan eventually.

== Prevalence ==
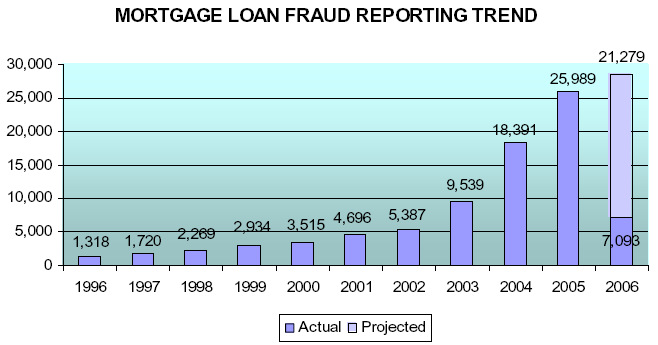
Mortgage fraud by borrowers from US Department of the Treasury

Mortgage fraud may be perpetrated by one or more participants in a loan transaction, including the borrower; a loan officer who originates the mortgage; a real estate agent, appraiser, a title or escrow representative or attorney; or by multiple parties as in the example of the fraud ring described above. Dishonest and unreputable stakeholders may encourage and assist borrowers in committing fraud because most participants are typically compensated only when a transaction closes.

During 2003 The Money Programme of the BBC in the UK uncovered systemic mortgage fraud throughout HBOS. The Money Programme found that during the investigation brokers advised the undercover researchers to lie on applications for self-certified mortgages from, among others, the Royal Bank of Scotland, The Mortgage Business and Birmingham Midshires Building Society.

In 2004, the FBI warned that mortgage fraud was becoming so rampant that the resulting "epidemic" of crimes could trigger a massive financial crisis. According to a December 2005 press release from the FBI, "mortgage fraud is one of the fastest growing white-collar crimes in the United States". Between March 1 and June 18, 2008, 406 people were arrested for mortgage fraud in an FBI sting across the country. People arrested include buyers, sellers and others across the wide-ranging mortgage industry.

A January 2023 working paper by Ronel Elul, Aaron Payne and Sebastian Tilson found that borrowers who falsely declared themselves owner-occupants made up one-third of the effective investor population in the residential mortgage originations it studied. The authors reported that such fraud was not confined to the housing bubble but continued in more recent originations.

== Fraud Enforcement and Recovery Act of 2009 ==
In May 2009, the Fraud Enforcement and Recovery Act of 2009, or FERA, Pub. L. 111–21 (text) (PDF), 123 Stat. 1617, S. 386, public law in the United States, was enacted. The law takes a number of steps to enhance criminal enforcement of federal fraud laws, especially regarding financial institutions, mortgage fraud, and securities fraud or commodities fraud.

Significant to note, Section 3 of the Act authorized additional funding to detect and prosecute fraud at various federal agencies, specifically:

- $165,000,000 to the Department of Justice,
- $30,000,000 each to the Postal Inspection Service and the Office of the Inspector General at the United States Department of Housing and Urban Development (HUD/OIG)
- $20,000,000 to the Secret Service
- $21,000,000 to the Securities and Exchange Commission

These authorizations were made for the federal fiscal years beginning October 1, 2009 and 2010, after which point they expire, and are in addition to the previously authorized budgets for these agencies.

== See also ==
- Federal Bureau of Investigation
- Phillip E. Hill Sr.
- Affordability of housing in the United Kingdom
- Mortgage Electronic Registration Systems
- United States housing bubble
- Taylor, Bean & Whitaker, top-10 U.S. wholesale mortgage lending firm that ceased business following fraud revelations
