= Phillip E. Hill Sr. =

Phillip E. Hill Sr. (born 1956) was the ringleader of the largest mortgage fraud scheme ever prosecuted in the State of Georgia.

== Mortgage fraud scheme ==
During his trial, prosecutors identified Hill as the ringleader in three interlocking mortgage fraud schemes built on metro-Atlanta real estate sales that, between 2001 and 2003, bilked lenders out of more than $40 million. According to the evidence at trial, Hill was the owner and operator of "We Build Atlanta, Inc.," "The Estate Firm, Inc.," "Estate Artistians of Georgia, Inc.," "Estates Atlanta, Inc.," and numerous other Georgia corporations. Hill controlled the affairs of each such corporation. Hill held himself out to be a real estate developer, and either individually or through one or more of the corporations he controlled, purchased and sold numerous residential properties in the Atlanta area. Hill oversaw the conspiracy, loan fraud, wire and mail fraud and money laundering activity related to mortgages obtained in the sale of over 50 homes and over 250 condominiums in eight Atlanta-area condominium complexes. These properties were all owned at one time by one of the Hill entities. Each property was sold at an inflated price to a "straw purchaser" who applied for a mortgage loan based upon the inflated price. The straw purchasers who participated in these mortgage flips were paid a kick-back out of the excess loan proceeds for the use of their name and credit. The victim-lenders granted the loans based upon numerous false representations and documents regarding the credit qualifications of the straw purchaser, as well as false representations that the straw purchaser had paid a down payment, would reside in the home, and would be responsible for the loan payment. In addition, the lenders were induced to make the loans based on fraudulently inflated appraisals. Some of the properties were "flipped" more than one time.

After a five-year investigation, a federal grand jury in 2005 charged Hill and 24 co-defendants, including real estate appraisers, closing attorneys, mortgage brokers, loan officers and straw purchasers, in an expanding indictment that eventually included 187 counts of mail fraud, wire fraud, bank fraud, bank credit fraud, money-laundering, bribery of a bank official and criminal conspiracy.

According to Assistant U.S. Attorney Barbara E. Nelan, the fraud ring's property schemes were based on the unlawful "flipping" of residential real estate. Illegal real property flipping is a fraud for profit scheme whereby recently acquired real property is resold for a considerable profit with an artificially inflated value. The real property is resold within a short time frame, often after making only cosmetic improvements to the real property. Illegal property flipping usually often involves collusion between a real estate appraiser, a mortgage originator and a closing agent. The cooperation of a real estate appraiser is necessary since a false and artificially inflated appraisal report is required. The buyer (ultimate borrower) may or may not be aware of the situation. This type of fraud is one of the most costly for lenders because the loss is always large.

One of the three fraud schemes involved sales of more than 50 luxury estates in several of metro Atlanta's "country club" subdivisions and more than 250 condominiums in eight complexes in Dunwoody, Buckhead, Midtown and downtown Atlanta.

A second scheme focused on sales at grossly inflated prices of 27 lots in the Cascade Oaks subdivision in southwest Atlanta. Centrum Financial Services Inc., which financed the $1.3 million deal, and was a victim of the scheme, eventually was forced to foreclose on those properties.

The third scheme—in which Hill joined with a former bank officer who has already been sentenced for his role—defrauded Charter Bank & Trust Co. in Marietta, Georgia of $170,000.

United States Attorney David Nahmias said, "The negative impact on our neighborhoods of this multimillion dollar fraud scheme extends far beyond the financial loss to the victim lenders. The Phillip Hill mortgage fraud scheme charged in this indictment is the most extensive this office and federal investigative agencies have uncovered to date in the Atlanta area. This indictment is a major step forward in this office's commitment to expose and eradicate mortgage fraud schemes in our community."

== Co-conspirators ==
Co-defendants who were also found guilty of multiple felony charges include Marcus Alcindor, a/k/a Christopher Alcindor of St. Lucia; Barbara Brown, a/k/a Barbara Eubanks, a real estate appraiser from Marietta, Georgia; Fred Farmer, a real estate appraiser from Roswell, Georgia; Christine Laudermill; Robert Powers of Cumming, Georgia; David Thomas of Hammond, Louisiana; and Dean Thomas and David Van Mersbergen, both of Atlanta, Georgia.

In addition to the defendants found guilty at trial, several other individuals pleaded guilty to mortgage fraud charges related to the same scheme before trial. These defendants include William Chavis of Atlanta, Georgia; Michael Flake of Stone Mountain, Georgia; Wesley Golden of Atlanta, Georgia; Christopher Halcomb, a former closing attorney from Cumming, Georgia who was disbarred by the State Bar of Georgia; Cortney Jackson of Detroit, Michigan; Wayne Jenkins, a mortgage broker from Atlanta, Georgia; Rashid Muhammad of Syracuse, New York; Julian Perez, a/k/a Tony Perez, a real estate appraiser from Roswell, Georgia; Brant Petree of Marietta, Marietta, Georgia; Theodore Tagalakis a mortgage broker from Atlanta, Georgia; and Andrew Wolf of Alpharetta, Georgia, a former closing attorney who voluntarily surrendered his license to the State Bar of Georgia on October 29, 2007 in lieu of disbarment.

=== Leslie Rector ===
According to the U.S. Attorney's Office and the information presented in court, Leslie Rector was Hill's right-hand man. U.S. District Judge Thomas W. Thrash Jr. sentenced Leslie Rector to seven years in federal prison followed by three years of supervised release for his participation in the massive mortgage fraud scheme that targeted the Atlanta area housing and condo market from 2000 through part of 2003. Judge Thrash also ordered Rector to pay $40.2 million in restitution.

== Incarceration ==
Hill was found guilty of 168 counts of fraud and money laundering on March 14, 2007 in the Northern District of Georgia. On September 21, 2007, U.S. District Judge Thomas W. Thrash Jr. sentenced Hill to prison for 28 years. Hill is currently incarcerated in the Federal Correctional Institution in Marianna, Florida, a medium security facility housing male inmates. His projected release date is August 2, 2031.

UPDATE: Hill was granted presidential clemency presidential clemency Dec 2024, ending his sentence and releasing him from custody.

== See also ==
- mortgage fraud
- flipping
- Taylor, Bean & Whitaker, top-10 U.S. wholesale mortgage lending firm that ceased business following fraud revelations
