= No income, no asset =

Mortgage lending concept

No income, no asset (or NINA) is one of many documentation types which lenders may allow when underwriting a mortgage in the United States mortgage industry. The lender of a NINA loan does not require that the applicant supply documentation of income or assets.

NINA programs are ostensibly created for those with hard to verify incomes (waiters, etc.) but in actuality have been popularly used in situations where aggressive mortgage lenders and brokers did not want any trouble qualifying otherwise non-qualifying loans, thus becoming a significant factor in the subprime lending crisis. A significant number of NINA loans were never possible for the applicant to repay and have resulted in defaults for this reason, as laid out in detail by investigative reporters, including the reporting of This American Life and Planet Money that culminated in the Peabody- and Polk- award-winning episode "The Giant Pool of Money."

== No income, no job, no assets ==
No income, no job, no asset (or NINJA) is a more extreme form of NINA where loans can be issued to an individual with no income at all. The applicant only needs to show a credit rating, which is presumed to reflect willingness and ability to pay. NINJA loans are very low-quality subprime loans. The term was popularized by Charles R. Morris in his 2008 book The Two Trillion Dollar Meltdown, though the acronym had been publicly used by some subprime lenders earlier. NINJA loans were especially prominent during the U.S. housing bubble of 2003–2007 and became notorious during the subprime mortgage crisis in 2007–2008 as an example of poor lending practices. It works on two levels – as an acronym; and as an allusion to the fact that NINJA loans are often defaulted on, with the borrower disappearing like a ninja.

The term was also popularized in the 2010 US film Wall Street: Money Never Sleeps by the character Gordon Gekko played by Michael Douglas.

== See also ==
- Adjustable rate mortgage – Mortgage loan with an interest rate that changes based on credit markets
- Alt-A – Type of U.S. mortgage
- Balloon payment mortgage – Type of mortgage where a large final payment is expected
- Buy now, pay later – Consumer lending approach
- NEET – Person who is not in education, employment, or training
- No doc loan – Loan that doesn't require income documentation
- Poverty industry – Businesses that make most of their money from the poor
- Unsecured debt – Obligation of repayment without a collateral
- Unsecured guarantor loan – Loan in which a party agrees to repay the borrower's debt if they default
