= Stated income loan =

Mortgage where borrowers state their income

A stated income loan is a mortgage where the lender does not verify the borrower's income by looking at their pay stubs, W-2 (employee income) forms, income tax returns, or other records. Instead, borrowers are simply asked to state their income, and taken at their word. These loans are sometimes called liar loans or liar's loans. Stated income loans were originated by Ameriquest.

== Reasons for stated income loans ==
These loans are nominally intended for self-employed borrowers, or other borrowers who might have difficulty documenting their income. Stated income loans have been extended to customers with a wide range of credit histories, including subprime borrowers. The lack of verification makes these loans particularly simple targets for fraud.

Stated income loans fill a gap of situations which normal loan standards would not approve. For example, a standard rule is that a customer's mortgage and other loan payments should take up no more than 45% of the person's income. This would seem prudent for a person just owning their main home. However, a real estate investor may have multiple properties and for each may receive only a small amount more than their loan payments on each house, but end up with $200,000 in disposable income. Nevertheless, a non-stated income loan would decline this person since their debt to income ratio would not be in line. The same issue can arise with self-employed borrowers, where the bank with a fully documented loan would include the borrower's business debt in their debt to income calculation. Stated income loans also help borrowers where fully documented loans normally would not consider the source of income as being reliable and stable, such as investors who consistently earn capital gains. Fully documented loans also do not consider potential future income increases. Another type of loan that uses the same principles is the no income disclosure loan.

In August 2006, Steven Krystofiak, president of the Mortgage Brokers Association for Responsible Lending, in a statement at a Federal Reserve hearing on mortgage regulation, reported that his organization had compared a sample of 100 stated income mortgage applications to IRS records, and found almost 60% of the sampled loans had overstated their income by more than 50 percent.

Stated income loans are still offered typically by small local banks. Qualification requirements are based on stable employment, good reserves, good FICO and no less than 40% equity position in the property. Stated income loan availability changes state to state, county to county.

== See also ==
- 2008 financial crisis – Worldwide economic crisis
- Alt-A – Type of U.S. mortgage
- No doc loan – Loan that doesn't require income documentation
- No income, no asset – Mortgage lending concept
- Predatory lending – Unethical lending practices
- Subprime lending – Loans to people with higher credit risk
