= Apparent Project =

Nonprofit Haitian artisans' guild

- Formation: 2008
- Founder: Shelley Clay, Marilyn Monaghan, Corrigan Clay
- Founded at: Haiti
- Type: Nonprofit
- Purpose: Humanitarian, activism
- Headquarters: Lacey, Washington
- Location: Port-au-Prince, Haiti
- Executive Director: Marilyn Monaghan
- Subsidiaries: Papillon Enterprise
- Funding: Donations, Grants, Product Sales
- Website: https://apparentproject.org/

Apparent Project is a 501(c)3 nonprofit co-founded by Shelley Clay, Marilyn Monaghan (current CEO), and Corrigan Clay in 2008. The Haitian employees of Apparent Project who create jewelry, clothing, and art pieces made out of metal, clay, cloth and paper are the parents of once- orphaned Haitian children. Apparent Project's artisans have included metal sculptors, jewelry makers, paper makers, bookbinders, seamstresses, and ceramicists. They produce jobs for parents to be able to retain custody of their children, rather than sending them to an orphanage because of extreme poverty. Apparent Project is a socially and ecologically conscious business with a mission to stimulate the Haitian economy and bringing an end to poverty-based relinquishment of children in Haiti.

Apparent Project is a business incubator for start-up businesses that help improve the economic situation of families in Haiti. It also does community development, education, job skills training, medical relief, prenatal care, and continues to market and promote its Papillon-branded goods as well as other Haitian artisan goods through its party sales and fundraisers. Apparent Project's goal is to see Haitian families stay together. Skill development and employment addresses the needs of families before they are at the point of desperation, driven to give their children to an orphanage because of extreme poverty.

== Background ==
Corrigan Clay and his ex-wife, Shelley Clay, founded Apparent Project with money inherited from Corrigan Clay's father. In 2008, Shelley Clay moved to Port-au-Prince and went to work in an orphanage. She later started "Papillon Enterprise" to give job skills to heads of households, and particularly mothers, to prevent child relinquishment. While starting Papillon Enterprise as a nonprofit, Shelley Clay depended upon grant funding; Papillon Enterprise later became a for-profit business. At the end of 2010 they sold $100,000 in jewelry through their nonprofit overseas exchange, Apparent Project. In 2013, Apparent Project's Papillon Enterprise had an estimated $1 million in sales. From 2013 to 2016, the company grew from 40 workers to over 300 workers. Clay seeks to have the issues of poverty in Haiti resolved through sustainable economic empowerment of the poor.

== Papillon Enterprise ==
In 2009, Apparent Project formally registered as a business in Haiti, as Papillon Enterprise. Papillon became the production hub for Apparent Project's merchandise. The artisans thus became legal employees on the tax registry, permitting many more employees to be hired.

== Wages ==
Minimum wage in Haiti is $5 per day and the average person makes $2 per day. Employees of Apparent Project make $15 per day and receive medical coverage. The employees have also included 30 prison inmates Clay has stated that "It's huge, because in Haiti you can't go to trial without money. She hopes to expand job opportunities in prisons, including a nearby women's prison.

== Partnerships ==
The Apparent Project partners with smaller nongovernmental organizations (NGOs) and faith-based nonprofits like The Global Orphan Project. In spring 2016, the Global Orphan Project (GO) carried necklaces and bracelets made by Apparent Project through its GO Exchange, which sells locally made clothing and accessories from Haiti, Uganda, and Ethiopia. They also have partnerships with stores including Gap and designers such as Donna Karan. Celebrities including Kim Kardashian, Maria Bello, Patricia Arquette, Olivia Wilde, Oprah Winfrey, and Bill Clinton have been supporters of Apparent Project.

=== Clinton Foundation's Support ===
In 2013 the organization received a grant of $150,000 from the Clinton Foundation. In 2015, Clinton Foundation President Donna Shalala, Chelsea Clinton, and Clinton Foundation supporters visited Apparent Project in Haiti. With grant support from the Clinton Foundation, the organization was able to reach new buyers, leading to greater market access, and ultimately permitting job creation while providing healthcare and on-site day care for its 300 workers. The grants paid for facility expansion, hiring, and equipment purchases. Electric kilns would require significant energy, and grants provided a rooftop solar system to power them, and most of the operations, with renewable energy.
