= Predatory lending =

Unethical lending practices

Predatory lending refers to unethical practices conducted by lending organizations during a loan origination process that are unfair, deceptive, or fraudulent. While there are no internationally agreed legal definitions for predatory lending, a 2006 audit report from the office of inspector general of the US Federal Deposit Insurance Corporation (FDIC) broadly defines predatory lending as "imposing unfair and abusive loan terms on borrowers", though "unfair" and "abusive" were not specifically defined. Though there are laws against some of the specific practices commonly identified as predatory, various federal agencies use the phrase as a catch-all term for multiple specific illegal activities in the loan industry. Predatory lending should not be confused with predatory mortgage servicing which is mortgage practices described by critics as unfair, deceptive, or fraudulent practices during the loan or mortgage servicing process, post loan origination.

One less contentious definition of the term is proposed by Investor Dictionary as "the practice of a lender deceptively convincing borrowers to agree to unfair and abusive loan terms, or systematically violating those terms in ways that make it difficult for the borrower to defend against". Other types of lending sometimes also referred to as predatory include payday loans, certain types of credit cards, mainly subprime, or other forms of (again, often subprime) consumer debt, and overdraft loans, when the interest rates are considered unreasonably high.

Although predatory lenders are most likely to target the less educated, the poor, racial minorities, and the elderly, victims of predatory lending are represented across all demographics. The continued occurrence of predatory lending can be viewed as a litmus test for the effectiveness of philanthropic lending that aims to foster entrepreneurship. Where such philanthropic lending initiatives (microfinance) are widely available, loan sharks and other predatory lenders should not continue to thrive.

Predatory lending typically occurs on loans backed by some kind of collateral, such as a car or house, so that if the borrower defaults on the loan, the lender can repossess or foreclose and profit by selling the repossessed or foreclosed property. Lenders may be accused of tricking a borrower into believing that an interest rate is lower than it actually is, or that the borrower's ability to pay is greater than it actually is. The lender, or others as agents of the lender, may well profit from repossession or foreclosure upon the collateral.

Predatory lending is often compared to (but not to be confused with) loan sharking, the difference between the two being that loan sharks do not seriously attempt to operate within the law.

== Abusive or unfair lending practices ==
There are a number of lending practices which have been called abusive and labeled with the term "predatory lending". There is a great deal of dispute between lenders and consumer groups as to what exactly constitutes "unfair" or "predatory" practices, but the following are sometimes cited:

- Unjustified risk-based pricing. This is the practice of charging more (in the form of higher interest rates and fees) for extending credit to borrowers identified by the lender as posing a greater credit risk. The lending industry argues that risk-based pricing is a legitimate practice; since a greater percentage of loans made to less creditworthy borrowers can be expected to go into default, higher prices are necessary to obtain the same yield on the portfolio as a whole. Some consumer groups argue that higher prices paid by more vulnerable consumers cannot always be justified by increased credit risk.
- Single-premium credit insurance. This is the purchase of insurance which will pay off the loan in case the homebuyer dies. It is more expensive than other forms of insurance because it does not involve any medical checkups, but customers almost always are not shown their choices, because usually the lender is not licensed to sell other forms of insurance. In addition, this insurance is usually financed into the loan which causes the loan to be more expensive, but at the same time encourages people to buy the insurance because they do not have to pay up front.
- Failure to present the loan price as negotiable. Many lenders will negotiate the price structure of the loan with borrowers. In some situations, borrowers can even negotiate an outright reduction in the interest rate or other charges on the loan. Consumer advocates argue that borrowers, especially unsophisticated borrowers, are not aware of their ability to negotiate and might even be under the mistaken impression that the lender is placing the borrower's interests above its own. Thus, many borrowers do not take advantage of their ability to negotiate.
- Failure to clearly and accurately disclose terms and conditions, particularly in cases where an unsophisticated borrower is involved. Mortgage loans are complex transactions involving multiple parties and dozens of pages of legal documents. In the most egregious of predatory cases, lenders or brokers have not only misled borrowers but have also altered documents after they have been signed.
- Short-term loans with disproportionally high fees, such as payday loans, credit card late fees, checking account overdraft fees, and Tax Refund Anticipation Loans, where the fee paid for advancing the money for a short period of time works out to an annual interest rate significantly in excess of the market rate for high-risk loans. The originators of such loans dispute that the fees are interest.
- Servicing agent and securitization abuses. The mortgage servicing agent is the entity that receives the mortgage payment, maintains the payment records, provides borrowers with account statements, imposes late charges when the payment is late, and pursues delinquent borrowers. A securitization is a financial transaction in which assets, especially debt instruments, are pooled and securities representing interests in the pool are issued. Most loans are subject to being bundled and sold, and the rights to act as servicing agent sold, without the consent of the borrower. A federal statute requires notice to the borrower of a change in servicing agent, but does not protect the borrower from being held delinquent on the note for payments made to the servicing agent who fails to forward the payments to the owner of the note, especially if that servicing agent goes bankrupt, and borrowers who have made all payments on time can find themselves being foreclosed on and becoming unsecured creditors of the servicing agent. Foreclosures can sometimes be conducted without proper notice to the borrower. In some states (see Texas Rule of Civil Procedure 746), there is no defense against eviction, forcing the borrower to move and incur the expense of hiring a lawyer and finding another place to live while litigating the claim of the "new owner" to own the house, especially after it is resold one or more times. When the debtor demands, under the best evidence rule, that the current claimed note owner produce the original note with the debtor's signature on it, the note owner typically is unable or unwilling to do so, and tries to establish his or her claim with an affidavit that it is the owner, without proving it is the "holder in due course", the traditional standard for a debt claim, and the courts often allow them to do that. In the meantime, the note continues to be traded, its physical whereabouts difficult to discover.

OCC Advisory Letter AL 2003-2 describes predatory lending as including the following:

- Loan "flipping" – frequent refinancings that result in little or no economic benefit to the borrower and are undertaken with the primary or sole objective of generating additional loan fees, prepayment penalties, and fees from the financing of credit-related products;
- Refinancings of special subsidized mortgages that result in the loss of beneficial loan terms;
- "Packing" of excessive and sometimes "hidden" fees in the amount financed;
- Using loan terms or structures – such as negative amortization – to make it more difficult or impossible for borrowers to reduce or repay their indebtedness;
- Using balloon payments to conceal the true burden of the financing and to force borrowers into costly refinancing transactions or foreclosures;
- Targeting inappropriate or excessively expensive credit products to older borrowers, to persons who are not financially sophisticated or who may be otherwise vulnerable to abusive practices, and to persons who could qualify for mainstream credit products and terms;
- Inadequate disclosure of the true costs, risks and, where necessary, appropriateness to the borrower of loan transactions;
- The offering of single premium credit life insurance; and
- The use of mandatory arbitration clauses.

== Predatory lending towards minority groups ==
Because multiple minority communities have been excluded from loans in the past, they are and have been more vulnerable to deception. Oftentimes, they are targeted because of these vulnerabilities. Organizations and agencies including ACORN, HUD, the American Civil Liberties Union, United for a Fair Economy and more prove that predatory loans are disproportionately made in poor and minority neighborhoods. Brokers and lenders preyed on these neighborhoods with the knowledge that these people were often denied for loans and the demand for loans were high. Lenders called these neighborhoods never-never land. This created the subprime predatory lending world.

Subprime lenders specialize in B, C, and D paper. Predatory lending is the practice of overcharging a borrower for rates and fees, average fee should be 1%, these lenders were charging borrowers over 5%. Consumers without challenged credit loans should be underwritten with prime lenders. In 2004, 69% of borrowers were from subprime lending. The 2007 mortgage drop and economy fail were from over lending. Organizations such as AARP, Inner City Press, and ACORN have worked to stop what they describe as predatory lending. ACORN has targeted specific companies such as HSBC Finance, successfully forcing them to change their practices. Some subprime lending practices have raised concerns about mortgage discrimination on the basis of race. African Americans and other minorities are being disproportionately led to sub-prime mortgages with higher interest rates than their white counterparts. Even when median income levels were comparable, home buyers in minority neighborhoods were more likely to get a loan from a subprime lender, though not necessarily a sub-prime loan.

== Other targeted groups ==
In addition, studies by leading consumer groups have concluded that women have become a key component to the subprime mortgage crunch. Professor Anita F. Hill wrote that a large percentage of first-time home buyers were women, and that loan officers took advantage of the lack of financial knowledge of female loan applicants. Consumers believe that they are protected by consumer protection laws, when their lender is really operating wholly outside the laws. Refer to 15 U.S.C. 1601 and 12 C.F.R. 226.

Media investigations have disclosed that mortgage lenders used bait-and-switch salesmanship and fraud to take advantage of borrowers during the home-loan boom. In February 2005, for example, reporters Michael Hudson and Scott Reckard broke a story in the Los Angeles Times about "boiler room" sales tactics at Ameriquest Mortgage, the nation's largest subprime lender. Hudson and Reckard cited interviews and court statements by 32 former Ameriquest employees who said the company had abused its customers and broken the law, "deceiving borrowers about the terms of their loans, forging documents, falsifying appraisals and fabricating borrowers' income to qualify them for loans they couldn't afford". Ameriquest later agreed to pay a $325 million (~$514 million in 2025) predatory lending settlement with state authorities across the nation.

== Disputes over predatory lending ==
Some subprime lending advocates, such as the National Home Equity Mortgage Association (NHEMA), say many practices commonly called "predatory," particularly the practice of risk-based pricing, are not actually predatory, and that some laws aimed at reducing "predatory lending" significantly restrict the availability of mortgage finance to lower-income borrowers. Such parties consider predatory lending a pejorative term.

== Underlying issues ==
There are a number of underlying issues in the predatory lending debate:

- Judicial practices: Some argue that much of the problem arises from a tendency of the courts to favor lenders, and to shift the burden of proof of compliance with the terms of the debt instrument to the debtor. According to this argument, it should not be the duty of the borrower to make sure his or her payments are getting to the current note-owner, but to make evidence that all payments were made to the last known agent for collection sufficient to block or reverse repossession or foreclosure, and eviction, and to cancel the debt if the current note owner cannot prove he or she is the "holder in due course" by producing the actual original debt instrument in court.
- Risk-based pricing: The basic idea is that borrowers who are thought of as more likely to default on their loans should pay higher interest rates and finance charges to compensate lenders for the increased risk. In essence, high returns motivate lenders to lend to a group they might not otherwise lend to – "subprime" or risky borrowers. Advocates of this system believe that it would be unfair – or a poor business strategy – to raise interest rates globally to accommodate risky borrowers, thus penalizing low-risk borrowers who are unlikely to default. Opponents argue that the practice tends to disproportionately create capital gains for the affluent while oppressing working-class borrowers with modest financial resources. Some people consider risk-based pricing to be unfair in principle. Lenders contend that interest rates are generally set fairly considering the risk that the lender assumes, and that competition between lenders will ensure availability of appropriately-priced loans to high-risk customers. Still others feel that while the rates themselves may be justifiable with respect to the risks, it is irresponsible for lenders to encourage or allow borrowers with credit problems to take out high-priced loans. For all of its pros and cons, risk-based pricing remains a universal practice in bond markets and the insurance industry, and it is implied in the stock market and in other open-market venues; it is only controversial in the case of consumer loans.
- Competition: Some believe that risk-based pricing is fair but feel that a number of loans charge prices far above the risk, using the risk as an excuse to overcharge. These criticisms are not levied on all products, but only on those specifically deemed predatory. Proponents counter that competition among lenders should prevent or reduce overcharging.
- Financial education: Some observers feel that competition in the markets served by what critics describe as "predatory lenders" is not affected by price because the targeted consumers are completely uneducated about the time value of money and the concept of Annual percentage rate, a different measure of price than what many are used to. Recent research looked at a legislative experiment in which the State of Illinois, which required “high-risk” mortgage applicants acquiring or refinancing properties in 10 specific zip codes to submit loan offers from state-licensed lenders to review by HUD-certified financial counselors. The experiment found that the legislation pushed some borrowers to choose less risky loan products in order to avoid counseling.
- Caveat emptor: There is an underlying debate about whether a lender should be allowed to charge whatever it wants for a service, even if there is no evidence that it attempted to deceive the consumer about the price. At issue here is the belief that lending is a commodity and that the lending community has an almost fiduciary duty to advise the borrower that funds can be obtained more cheaply. Also at issue are certain financial products which appear to be profitable only due to adverse selection or a lack of knowledge on the part of the customers relative to the lenders. For example, some people allege that credit insurance would not be profitable to lending companies if only those customers who had the right "fit" for the product actually bought it (i.e., only those customers who were not able to get the generally cheaper term life insurance). Regardless, the majority of U.S. courts have refused to treat the lender-borrower relationship as a fiduciary one and declined to impose a duty of care upon lenders in the making of loans. Thus, once the lender has complied with all relevant statutory disclosure obligations, it remains solely the borrower's problem to ascertain whether the loan they are getting is the right fit for them.

== Predatory borrowing ==
In an article in the January 17, 2008, New York Times, George Mason University economics professor Tyler Cowen described "predatory borrowing" as potentially a larger problem than predatory lending:

As much as 70 percent of recent early payment defaults had fraudulent misrepresentations on their original loan applications, according to one recent study. The research was done by BasePoint Analytics, which helps banks and lenders identify fraudulent transactions; the study looked at more than three million loans from 1997 to 2006, with a majority from 2005 to 2006. Applications with misrepresentations were also five times as likely to go into default. Many of the frauds were simple rather than ingenious. In some cases, borrowers who were asked to state their incomes just lied, sometimes reporting five times actual income; other borrowers falsified income documents by using computers.

Mortgage applications are usually completed by mortgage brokers or lenders' in-house loan officers, rather than by borrowers themselves, making it difficult for borrowers to control the information that was submitted with their applications.

A stated income loan application is done by the borrower, and no proof of income is needed. When the broker files the loan, they have to go by whatever income is stated. This opened the doors for borrowers to be approved for loans that they otherwise would not qualify for, or afford. However, lawsuits and testimony from former industry insiders indicated that mortgage company employees frequently were behind overstatements of borrower income on mortgage applications.

Borrowers had little or no ability to manipulate other key data points that were frequently falsified during the mortgage process. These included credit scores, home appraisals and loan-to-value ratios. These were all factors that were under the control of mortgage professionals. In 2012, for example, New York Attorney General Eric Schneiderman reached a $7.8 million (~$10.8 million in 2025) settlement of allegations that a leading appraisal management firm had helped inflate real estate appraisals on a wide scale basis in order to help a major lender push through more loan deals. The attorney general office's lawsuit alleged that eAppraiseIT, which did more than 260,000 appraisals nationally for Washington Mutual, caved to pressure from WaMu loan officers to select pliable appraisers who were willing to submit inflated property valuations.

Several commentators have dismissed the notion of "predatory borrowing", accusing those making this argument as being apologists for the lack of lending standards and other excesses during the credit bubble.

Predatory servicing is also a component of predatory lending, characterized by unfair, deceptive, or fraudulent practices by a lender or another company that services a loan on behalf of the lender, after the loan is granted. Those practices include also charging excessive and unsubstantiated fees and expenses for servicing the loan, wrongfully disclosing credit defaults by a borrower, harassing a borrower for repayment and refusing to act in good faith in working with a borrower to effectuate a mortgage modification as required by federal law.

== Legislation ==
In some countries, legislation aims to control this, but research has found ambiguous results, including finding that high-cost mortgage applications can possibly rise after adoption of laws against predatory lending.

=== United States ===
Many laws at both the Federal and state government level are aimed at preventing predatory lending. Although not specifically anti-predatory in nature, the Federal Truth in Lending Act requires certain disclosures of APR and loan terms. Also, in 1994, section 32 of the Truth in Lending Act, entitled the Home Ownership and Equity Protection Act of 1994, was created. This law is devoted to identifying certain high-cost, potentially predatory mortgage loans and reining in their terms. Twenty-five states have passed anti-predatory lending laws. Arkansas, Georgia, Illinois, Maine, Massachusetts, North Carolina, New York, New Jersey, New Mexico and South Carolina are among those states considered to have the strongest laws.

Other states with predatory lending laws include: California, Colorado, Connecticut, Florida, Kentucky, Maine, Maryland, Nevada, Ohio, Oklahoma, Oregon, Pennsylvania, Texas, Utah, Wisconsin, and West Virginia. These laws usually describe one or more classes of "high-cost" or "covered" loans, which are defined by the fees charged to the borrower at origination or the APR. While lenders are not prohibited from making "high-cost" or "covered" loans, a number of additional restrictions are placed on these loans, and the penalties for noncompliance can be substantial.

== See also ==
- Alternative financial services – Financial service provided outside traditional banking institutions
- Bank fraud – Form of financial crime
- Debt bondage – Slavery as a means to repay debt
- Debt-trap diplomacy – Diplomatic practice coercing alignment or access of an indebted country to its creditor
- Financial literacy – Ability to make informed choices about money
- Loan shark – Person who offers loans at extremely high interest rates
- Mortgage fraud – Fraud relating to secured loans
- Overdraft – Payments from a bank account exceeding the balance
- Poverty industry – Businesses that make most of their money from the poor
- Refund anticipation loan – Short-term consumer loan against an expected tax refund
- Securitization – Financial engineering practice
- Settlement (finance) – Physical exchange of securities or payment
- Title loan – Secured loan using borrower's vehicle title as collateral
- Usury – Loans with unfairly high interest rate
