= Straw borrower =

A straw borrower is a United States term for an individual whose name, social security number, and credit history are used to hide the identity of the organizers of a for-profit mortgage fraud scheme.

Straw buyers are also used in order to obtain a residential mortgage for a person who would not qualify for the loan, frequently a family member or friend. In for profit schemes, the straw buyer is usually compensated by the organizer for the use of his financial identity. While the straw borrower may have been lured into the transaction with the promise that he would not be liable for the mortgage payments, the straw is legally bound once the mortgage is obtained and will be responsible for making the payments. If the mortgage goes into default or is foreclosed, it will be reported under the straw borrower's name and his credit will be ruined. Misrepresentation of identity on a federally related mortgage transaction is a criminal offense punishable by up to 30 years imprisonment.

== See also ==
- Straw man
