= Poverty industry =

Businesses that make most of their money from the poor

Poverty industry or poverty business are a wide range of commercial activities that attract a large portion of their business from the poor. Businesses in the poverty industry often include payday loan centers, pawnshops, rent-to-own centers, casinos and gambling, lotteries, liquor stores, tobacco stores, credit card companies, and bail-bond services. Illegal ventures such as loansharking might also be included. The poverty industry makes roughly US$33 billion a year in the United States. In 2010, elected American federal officials received more than $1.5 million in campaign contributions from poverty-industry donors.

In poorer countries, the poverty industry exploits the bottom of the pyramid and its extent can at times be used as a litmus test to assess the effectiveness of poverty reduction initiatives. In some cases, the poverty industry directly takes advantage of poverty-alleviation initiatives (e.g. formal, government-supported microfinance). For example, some moneylenders misrepresent themselves as formal microfinance initiatives or obtain loans from formal microfinance initiatives through deception. They on-lend these loans to micro-entrepreneurs (informal intermediation).

== See also ==
- Alternative financial service – Financial service provided outside traditional banking institutions
- Economic inequality – Distribution of income or wealth between different groups
- Ghetto tax – Poor people often incur higher expenses due to lack of options
- Misery index (economics) – Economic indicator measuring economic and social cost
- Pay-to-stay (imprisonment) – Practice of charging prisoners money for their involuntary stay
- Predatory lending – Unethical lending practices
- Working poor – Working people whose incomes fall below the poverty line
- Poverty industrial complex – Privatization of social services
- Wage slavery – Term criticizing labor exploitation
- Debt buyer
