= Money Mart =

North American financial services company

- Company type: Parent
- Industry: Financial Services
- Founded: (1979)
- Headquarters: Toronto, Ontario, Canada
- Number of locations: 350+ (2024)
- Area served: Canada, United States
- Products: Personal loan, installment loan, payday loan, check cashing, prepaid debit cards, currency exchange
- Website: www.moneymart.ca

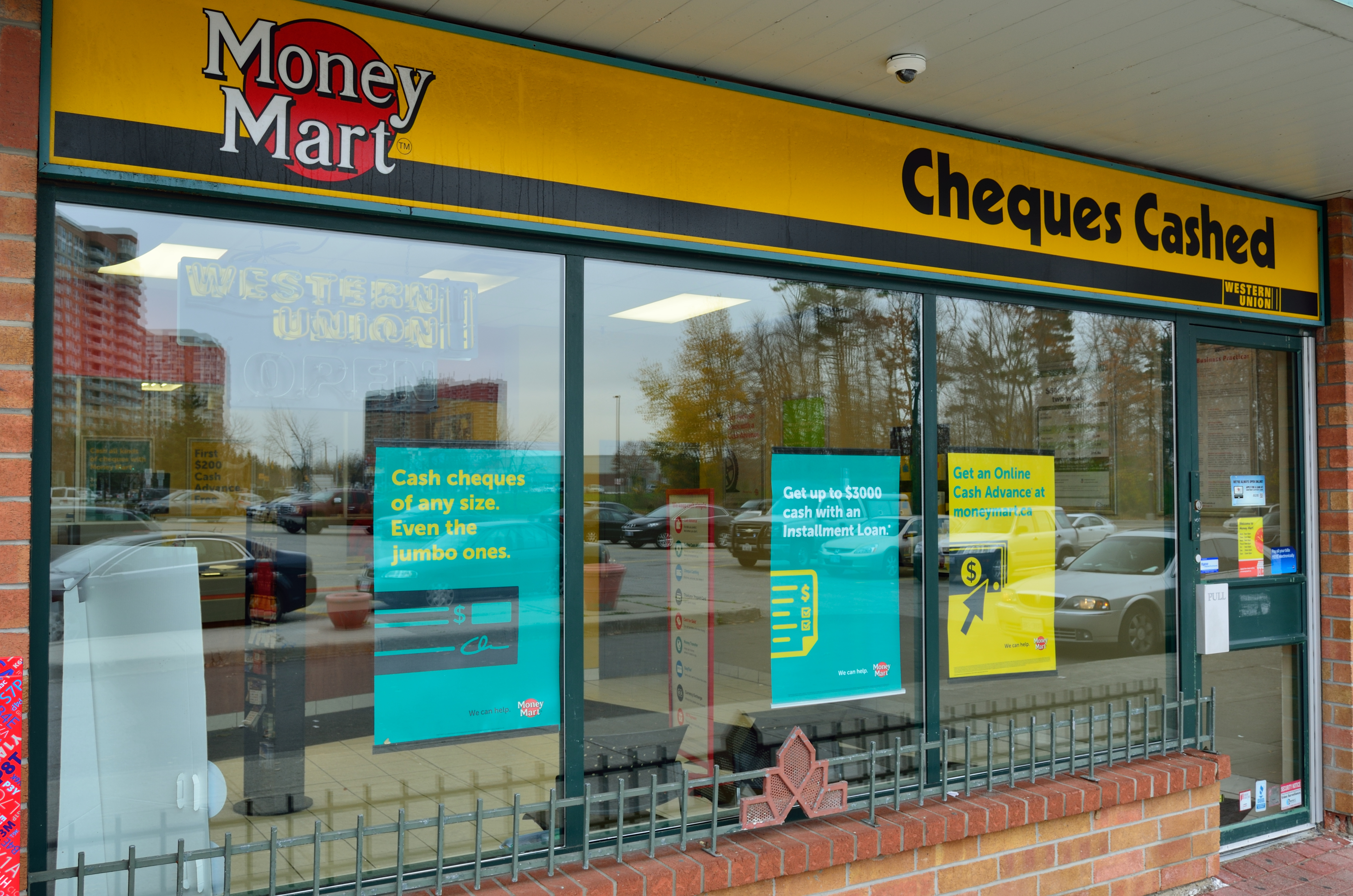
Money Mart in Toronto

Money Mart Financial Services, formerly Dollar Financial Group, is a financial services company with over 350 locations in Canada and the United States. The company offers a range of financial services, including personal loan, installment loan, payday loan, check cashing, prepaid card, and money transfer services. It focuses on the underbanked and subprime customer segments. Prior to 2018, the name 'Money Mart' was associated only with the 38-year-old Canadian unit DFG acquired in November 1996.

Money Mart Financial Services operates under a number of retail brands. In Canada, the company has Money Mart and Insta-Chèques stores. In the U.S. it has Money Mart and The Check Cashing Store locations. Some services are also offered online via the company’s consumer websites.

== History ==
logo still used at many locations

Founded in 1979 as Monetary Management Corporation, the company changed its name to Dollar Financial Group in 1990. In 1996, it purchased Money Mart, which was founded as an entrepreneurial venture in 1982 in Edmonton, Alberta. Money Mart Financial Services was purchased by a private equity fund manager in 2014, which took the company private.

== Associations ==
Money Mart is a member of the Community Financial Services Association of America (CFSA). National Money Mart, the company's Canadian subsidiary, is a member of the Canadian Consumer Finance Association (CCFA), and is accredited by the Better Business Bureau.

== Controversies ==
On Dec. 23, 2003, a $515 million Ontario class action lawsuit was started against Money Mart by Margaret Smith of Windsor, Ontario, Canada. The action alleges that Dollar Financial and Money Mart caused the plaintiffs to pay interest at a criminal rate contrary to section 347 of the Criminal Code.

The lawsuit was settled on June 5, 2009, with no admission of wrongdoing from Money Mart. Money Mart agreed to pay approximately $120 million in cash, legal fees, debt releases and "transferable transaction credits".

== See also ==
- Payday loans in Canada
