= TMX Finance =

American financial company

- Type: Private/Employee Owned
- Industry: Consumer Lending
- Founded: June 2010; 16 years ago Savannah, Georgia
- Headquarters: Savannah, Georgia, United States
- Products: Title Loans, Title Pawn, personal loans
- Services: Alternative financial service
- Owner: Tracy Young

TMX Finance was an American company that provided consumer loans and payday loans through its subsidiaries including TitleMax, TitleBucks, EquityAuto Loan, and InstaLoan. The company held more than 1,000 stores in seventeen states including Alabama, Arizona, California, Delaware, Florida, Georgia, Mississippi, Missouri, Nevada, New Mexico, Ohio, South Carolina, Tennessee, Texas, Utah, Virginia, and Wisconsin, and an online presence in Idaho.

TMX Finance’s brands served individuals who generally have limited access to consumer credit from banks, thrift institutions, credit card lenders, and other traditional sources of consumer credit.

TMX Finance was owned by Tracy Young of Savannah, Georgia until 2023, when it was acquired by CCF Holdings, LLC. Post acquisition, TitleMax, TitleBucks, and InstaLoan still operate locations, along with their sister companies, including Speedy Cash, Check Into Cash, easymoney, Community Choice Financial, and more. CCF Holdings, LLC. controls over 1,500 stores nationwide in 30 states and also offers online products in some states.

== History ==
TMX Finance changed its name from TitleMax Holdings, LLC, to TMX Finance LLC as of June 21, 2010.

In mid-2011, TMX Finance “reopened its 13.25% secured notes due 2015 with an add-on of $60 million non-fungible bonds.”

During the second fiscal quarter ended June 30, 2011, TMX Finance opened or acquired 89 new stores. In Texas, 49 stores were opened. In addition, TitleMax entered Nevada, Arizona, and Florida by acquiring 18 stores in Las Vegas and opening 6 stores in Tucson and 1 store in Pensacola. In May 2011, TMX Finance, closed on an asset purchase agreement Cashback Title Loans, Inc., in which TMX Finance acquired all the title loans related to Cashback locations in Nevada. In June 2011, TMX Finance acquired 14 Rainbow Title Loan Company locations – 6 of which were in Las Vegas, 4 in St. Louis, Missouri, and 4 in Kansas City, Missouri. TMX Finance acquired BudgetLine Cash Advance, LLC, and BudgetLine Cash of Missouri, LLC, in 2011. During the third fiscal quarter ended September 30, 2011, TMX Finance opened or acquired 36 new stores, which included 15 stores in Texas, 6 stores in Virginia, 4 stores in Arizona, and 2 stores in Georgia. There was a total of 8 stores acquired and opened in Missouri and 1 store in Nevada. For the third fiscal quarter of 2011, the Company had revenues of $133.7 million, an increase of $31.2 million from the same period of 2010, and a net income of $16.6 million. In the last 10 years, TMX Finance ceased operations in California, Idaho, Illinois, New Mexico, Ohio, and Virginia.

It was the parent company of TitleMax, TitleBucks, and InstaLoan until 2023 when the company was acquired by CCF Holdings, LLC.

== Brands ==
Prior to the 2023 acquisition, TMX Finance oversaw over 900 stores and employed over 3,300 people nationwide. The Company operated as TitleMax, TitleBucks, and InstaLoan in 16 states. TMX Finance also offered a second-lien automobile product in Georgia under the EquityAuto Loan brand, although operations under this brand have ceased.

== Industry overview ==
Customers use the services provided by the alternative financial services industry for a variety of reasons, including that they often: do not have access to traditional credit-based lenders like banks, thrift institutions, and credit card companies; have a sudden and unexpected need for cash due to common financial challenges like medical emergencies, vehicle repairs, divorce, job changes, or other unexpected expenses; are self-employed small business owners with an immediate need for short-term working capital; need a small amount of cash immediately and do not have time to wait for a traditional lender to approve a loan; and see such services as a sensible alternative to potentially higher costs and negative credit consequences of other alternatives, such as overdraft fees, bounced check fees, or late fees.

== Bankruptcy Exception in Georgia ==
In July 2023, ProPublica reported that in Georgia, TitleMax had won a 2017 federal court case that enabled the company to sidestep protections normally available under Chapter 13 bankruptcy. "Normally, Chapter 13 ... clears some debts and reduces payments on others through a court-approved repayment plan that the debtor can afford." The court ruled that title loans operated under state pawn shop laws. TitleMax charges more than 100% interest per year on car title loans.
