= Hypur =

Payment and banking technology platform

Hypur Inc.
- Industry: Financial Services
- Founded: 2014; 11 years ago
- Founder: Michael J. Sinnwell, Jr.
- Headquarters: Scottsdale, Arizona, U.S.
- Services: banking services money service businesses monitor transactions electronic payments
- Number of employees: 8
- Website: hypur.com

Hypur is a Scottsdale-based payment and banking technology platform that was built to enable financial institutions to responsibly and sustainably bank highly regulated industries, such as cannabis.

Founded in 2014, the platform helps monitor transactions and provides the level of transparency needed to comply with government regulations.

== Overview ==
Hypur is the result of the combined efforts of a team of banking compliance officials and software and payment entrepreneurs which includes Michael J. Sinnwell, Jr., David J. Querciagrossa, Todd Fuller. Together, they identified the gaps between traditional banking processes and the unique needs of emerging industries, including highly regulated ones, and built solutions for them.

Hypur's software which can be integrated with POS systems, provides a level of transparency needed to ensure compliance with state laws. The platform also has built in efficiencies for enhanced due diligence and document management that helps audit companies on state licenses, financial statements, tax returns, property leases, among others.

The Hypur platform enables financial institutions to support cash-intensive businesses, including money service businesses like payday lenders, check cashers, money transmitters, off-track betting and pawn dealers.

== Hypur Pay ==
Hypur Pay provides a secure electronic payment alternative to cash, debit and credit cards. It provides banks and credit unions with real-time access to transaction data and can provide a chain of cash custody that enables permissible commerce to a regulatory challenged industry that is illegal under Federal Law.

Other features of the software include automated and intelligent document management, invoice capture, advanced reporting and customized alert notifications.
