= 1414 Danforth Avenue =

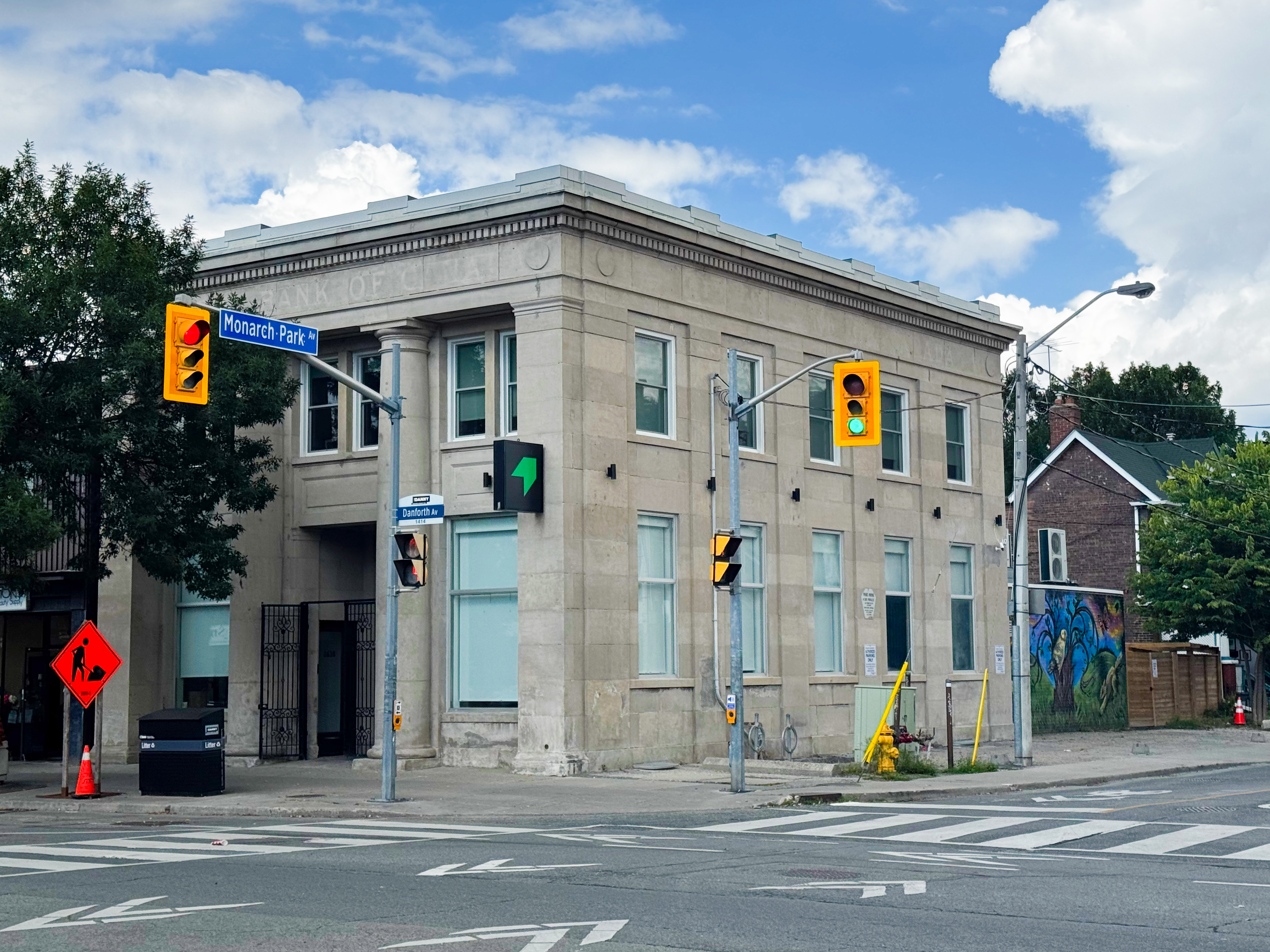
- Interactive map of the 1414 Danforth Avenue area

General information
- Type: Bank branch
- Architectural style: Stripped Classicism
- Location: 1414 Danforth Avenue; Toronto, Ontario, Canada
- Coordinates: 43.68271395429247°N 79.32740645077747°W
- Completed: 1919, 1929

Design and construction
- Architects: Langley & Howland; Seligman & Dick

1414 Danforth Avenue (2nd floor offices municipally referred to as 1416 Danforth) is a former Imperial Bank of Canada branch located at 1414 Danforth Avenue in Toronto, Ontario. It is a two-storey Stripped Classical edifice, designed in 1927 by the Toronto architecture firm Langley & Howland and completed in 1928. In 2022 the building was officially listed in the City of Toronto's Heritage Register.

== History ==
The first Imperial Bank branch on the site was a temporary building constructed in 1919, and listed by the bank as active from 1920 onward. The manager at opening was Harold Thorp Beaty who remained manager until at least 1949.

The branch remained in operation as an Imperial Bank of Canada branch through the 1961 merger with the Canadian Bank of Commerce, at which point it became a branch of the newly established Canadian Imperial Bank of Commerce.

In 1999, CIBC sold the property, and a Money Mart payday loans company began operating on the main floor. In 2023 the building was sold again, this time to Raw Signal Group, a management training company. In 2025, local artist Izzy Paez painted a mural over the northern extension of the building.
