= TitleMax =

American title lending business (founded 1998)

TitleMax, Inc.

- A TitleMax location in Savannah, Georgia, 2017
- Type: Private
- Industry: Consumer lending
- Founded: September 1998 Columbus, Georgia, United States
- Founder: Tracy Young
- Headquarters: Carrollton, Texas, United States
- Number of locations: 850+
- Area served: Alabama; Arizona; Delaware; Georgia; Kansas; Mississippi; Missouri; Nevada; South Carolina; Tennessee; Texas; Utah; Wisconsin
- Key people: Kyle Hanson (Executive Chairman); Bill Baker (President)
- Products: Title Loans; Title Pawns; Personal Loans; Lines of Credit
- Services: Alternative Financial Services
- Website: titlemax.com

TitleMax, Inc. is an American privately owned title lending business with the corporate office located in Carrollton, Texas. The company has more than 850 stores in thirteen states. TitleMax serves individuals who generally have limited access to consumer credit from banks, thrift institutions, credit card lenders, and other traditional sources of consumer credit. TitleMax offers title loan and title pawn products, which allow customers to meet their liquidity needs by borrowing against the value of their vehicles while retaining use of their vehicle during the term of the loan. In some states, TitleMax also offers personal loans and lines of credit.

== History ==
On September 1, 1998, TitleMax opened the first location in Columbus, Georgia. In October 1998, TitleMax opened its second location in Savannah, Georgia. Many Savannah locations were then established, and later that year, TitleMax opened the first out-of-state store in Phenix City, Alabama. Over the next ten years, the company continued expanding, eventually growing to over 500 locations by the end of 2007, and surpassing $200,000,000 in account receivables. In 2008, TitleMax expanded into Virginia. In April 2009, TitleMax Holdings, LLC, filed for chapter 11 bankruptcy. According to TitleMax’s lawyer at the time, the cause of the default was attributed to “the maturity of an estimated $165 million loan from Merrill Lynch & Co.” In 2008, Bank of America acquired Merrill Lynch. The attorney of DLA Piper LLP in New York City was quoted in an interview conducted by Bloomberg as saying, “It’s a solvent company, there’s a significant amount of equity over the debt.” In April 2010, nearly one year after the bankruptcy filing, TitleMax Holdings LLC won court approval for reorganization and was able to exit bankruptcy status. Since reorganization, TitleMax continued expanding into other states.

Over the last 10 years, TitleMax has ceased business in California, Idaho, Illinois, New Mexico, Ohio, and Virginia.

In 2023, TitleMax was acquired by CCF Holdings LLC (Community Choice Financial Family of Brands), along with its sister companies TitleBucks and InstaLoan.

In January 2025, a sponsorship of Front Row Motorsports and NASCAR® driver Zane Smith was formally announced.

In December of 2025, Katapult Holdings, Inc. announced it had entered into a definitive agreement with CCF Holdings LLC and The Aaron's Company, Inc. to combine in an all-stock transaction. This transaction closed on August 11, 2026. CCF, along with Aaron's, are a subsidiary of Katapult and currently traded on NASDAQ under the ticker symbol "KPLT."

== Sister Companies ==
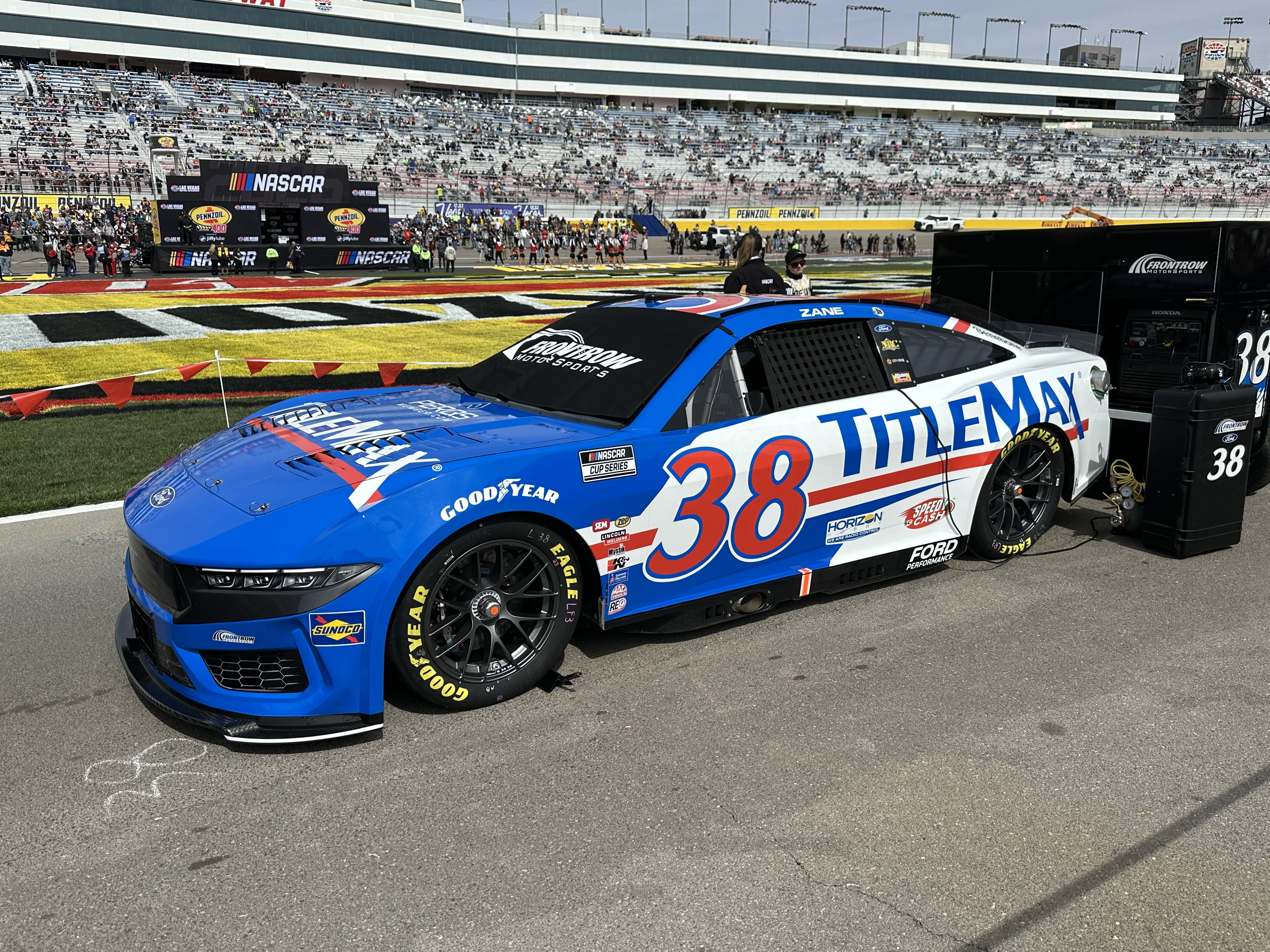
#38 Ford Mustang Dark Horse, driven by Zane Smith, with primary sponsor TitleMax featured on the paint scheme.

TitleMax, its sister companies TitleBucks and InstaLoan, and their former parent company (TMX Finance, formerly known as TitleMax Holdings) were acquired in July 2023 by CCF Holdings, LLC. Post acquisition under CCFI, TitleMax now has additional sister companies, including Speedy Cash, Check Into Cash, easymoney, Community Choice Financial, and more.

CCFI controls over 1,500 stores nationwide.

== NASCAR Sponsorship ==
In 2025, TitleMax joined its sister company, Speedy Cash, in a sponsorship of Front Row Motorsports driver Zane Smith. The sponsorship continues through the 2026 season. In April of 2025, Zane Smith won his first Busch Light Pole Award, qualifying P1 for the Jack Link's 500 at Talladega Superspeedway in the #38 TitleMax Ford Mustang Dark Horse. TitleMax was also the primary sponsor of the #4 Ford Mustang Dark Horse, driven by Noah Gragson, for one race in 2025 and one race in 2026.

== Criticisms ==
TitleMax was subject to a fine of $9 Million by the Consumer Financial Protection Bureau for unlawful debt collection practices and for luring consumers into expensive renewals of their existing loans. A Nevada Court Judge ordered TMX Finance to void over 6,000 loans due to these unlawful practices. In 2019, TitleMax was subject to a fine of $25,000 and a $700,000 refund to more than 21,000 customers to resolve allegations of excessive interest and fee charges.

TitleMax has received criticism for predatory lending.
