= Moneytree =

US retail financial services provider

Moneytree, Inc.
- Type: Private
- Industry: Financial services
- Founded: October 31, 1983
- Headquarters: Tukwila, Washington, United States
- Number of locations: 64 stores
- Area served: United States
- Key people: Dennis Bassford (CEO)
- Services: Financing
- Website: www.moneytreeinc.com

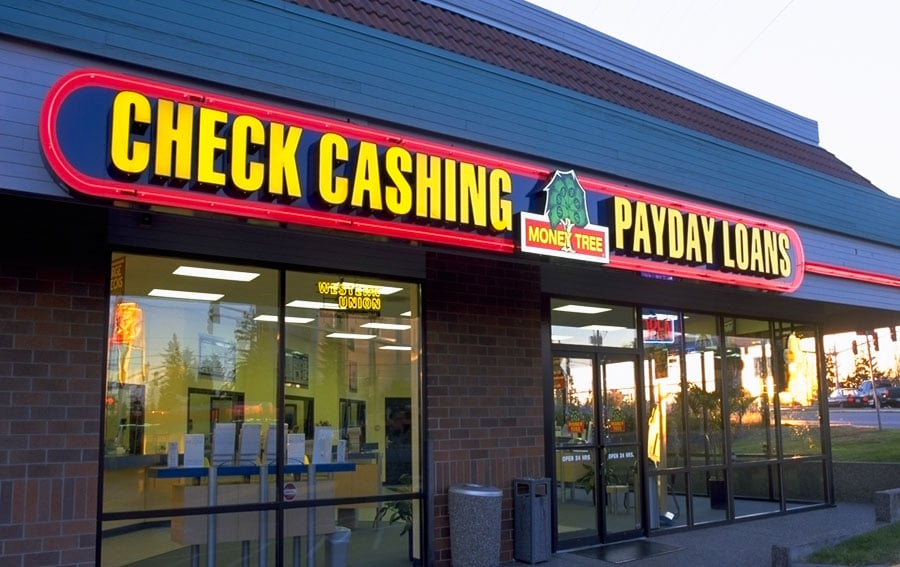
A Moneytree store in Everett, Washington

Moneytree, Inc. is a retail financial services provider headquartered in Tukwila, Washington, that offers payday loans, installment loans, prepaid debit cards, money orders, bill payment, Western Union transfers, auto equity and title loans.

In 2019, Moneytree had around 120 branches in Washington, California, Colorado, Idaho, and Nevada and British Columbia. However, only 58 branches remain in 2026, and Moneytree no longer operates in Canada, though all of their products are now available through their website.

In 2013, Moneytree won "Best Place to Work in Colorado" in the small business category.

== Origins ==
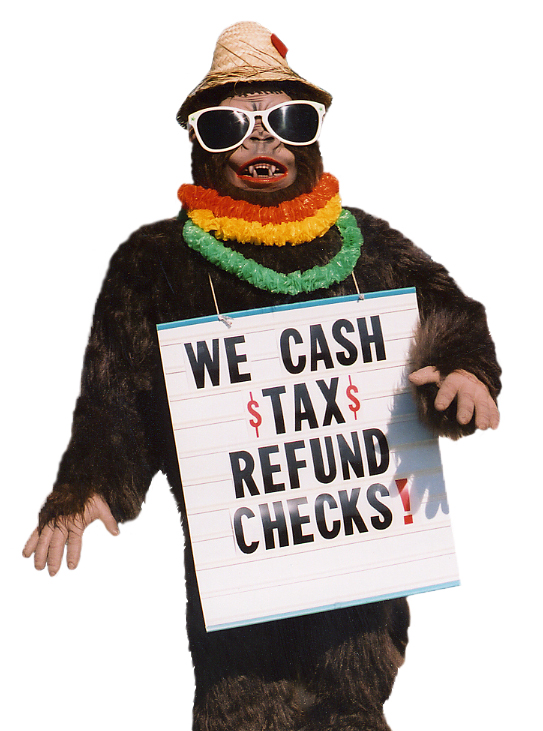
In the early days, Moneytree used a gorilla suit in their advertisements.

Moneytree first opened on October 31, 1983 in Renton, Washington as a check cashing store. Over the years, the business expanded its product lines to what it offers today. Dennis Bassford, an Idaho native and Boise State University alum, has been the CEO and owner since the inception, along with his brother David Bassford and his wife, Sara Bassford.

The name refers to a common saying.

== Regulation and political influence ==
As a retail financial provider, Moneytree is subject to laws as defined by the Consumer Financial Protection Bureau (CFPB) as well as applicable state and local laws. While Moneytree has not done much lobbying at the national level outside of donating to presidential campaigns, they have made several efforts to influence and alter laws at the state level. Notable examples of this include bills in Nevada, Colorado, Idaho, Oregon, and their home state of Washington.

=== Washington RCW 31.45 ===
In 2009, Washington passed RCW 31.45, which enacted stringent reforms on payday lending in the state, including the stipulation that a short-term loan "may not exceed $700 or thirty percent of the gross monthly income of the borrower, whichever is lower". Before the passing of RCW 31.45, the payday loan industry in Washington was worth $1.3 billion per year operating out of 603 locations across Washington state. By 2014, those numbers had dropped to 173 locations generating $331 million. In that same time, Moneytree and its executives pledged more than $200,000 in political contributions to state and national officials in the 2010 election cycle, with over half coming directly from CEO and Owner Dennis Bassford, Vice President David Bassford, and his wife Sara Bassford.

In 2013, Moneytree hired Sound View Strategies, a well-connected public-affairs and lobbying firm, to help create and pass SB-5312, a bill that proposed raising the maximum amount a borrower can take out at one time from $700 to $1,500 with an interest rate up to 36 percent. The bill would allow lenders to charge a $225 "origination fee" plus a monthly 7.5 percent maintenance fee on the loan. Critics pointed out that these fees "could push the effective annual rate above 200 percent, according to a calculation by the state Department of Financial Institutions".

According to documents sourced by the Seattle Times, Sound View Strategies was retained for an $8,000-per-month “lobbyist's fee" with a $15,000 “wrapping up fee” if the legislation was approved by March 5 of that year. The bill made it through the Senate, but was unable to make it through the House before expiring at the April 19th deadline.

=== Washington HB-1922 ===
Moneytree again tried to change the laws in Washington in 2015 with a bill sponsored by Rep. Larry Springer and Sen. Marko Liias—both of whom had previously received donations from Moneytree. The bill proposed creating a “small consumer installment loan” system that would allow lenders to offer 6-month to 12-month loans with effective interest rates up to 213%. The bill never made it into law.

=== Oregon Chapter 725A ===
In 2007, Oregon made Chapter 725 — Consumer Finance into law. These changes capped interest rates at 36% as well as placed other restrictions on businesses like Moneytree that operated within the state. As a result, Moneytree withdrew from the Oregon market, and as of 2020, there are only seven licensed payday lenders in Oregon.

=== Colorado Proposition 111 ===
In 2018, Colorado voters passed Proposition 111 by a margin of 77% to 22%. It stipulated that all loans must be repayable over an extended period of time (longer than two weeks) and capped their interest rates, effectively eliminating payday loans. As a result, Moneytree began offering installment loans which can be paid back over six months.

=== Nevada SB 201 ===
A 2018 audit of Nevada's Financial Institutions Division (FID) found nearly one in three high-interest lenders in the state of Nevada failed compliance reviews during the previous five years; it's unclear how many of these faults applied to Moneytree. Sen. Yvanna Cancela claimed that a loan tracking database would have “significant value to the Division, its licensees, and Legislators.”

On February 18, 2019, the Nevada state legislature introduced SB 201, a bill that codified provisions of the federal Military Lending Act and required the Commissioner of Financial Institutions to "develop, implement, and maintain a database storing certain information relating to deferred deposit loans, title loans, and high-interest loans made to customers in [Nevada]." SB 201 would require lenders to record not just loan details, but also "any grace periods, extensions, renewals, refinances, repayment plans, collection notices, and declined loans".

Lobbyists for retail financial providers, including Moneytree, claimed that the proposed law was "unfairly targeted" and that the measure could lead to more “underground non-regulated short-term loans". Despite this, the Nevada State Senate voted to approve the bill on April 19, 2019. After a delay due to the COVID-19 pandemic, the database was officially created in December 2020.

=== 2024 Nevada Ballot Initiative ===
In 2024, a non-profit called Stop Predatory Lending NV, funded in part by the Sixteen Thirty Fund, filed two petitions for ballot initiatives that would cap annual interest rates at 36 percent on short-term loans like as payday and title loans. The first petition also included language to increase how much money from a person’s bank account and weekly wages is protected from a seizure for an unpaid debt; the second petition does not include that language. In turn, Moneytree donated $25,000 to Nevadans for Financial Choice, who opposed the petition.

In March of the same year, a Carson City judge rejected the first petition because it was too broad, a decision that was upheld by the state Supreme Court in June. The same district court judge approved the narrower petition, which is pending an appeal in the state Supreme Court. This narrowed petition, S-03-2024, failed to get the required signatures by the November deadline, and the petition ended.

=== Idaho HB-649 ===
In 2026, Idaho Rep. Bruce Skaug introduced HB-649 which, if passed, would restrict the interest charged by short-term lenders to either 30% or 10% over the prime rate set by the Federal Reserve, whichever is higher. Skaug evoked the teachings of Jesus as part of his argument against high-interest loans and hoped that legislators would "vote their consciences and support the bill to protect vulnerable community members from predatory lenders".

Trent Matson, Moneytree’s Director of Government Affairs, testified in opposition of the bill. When speaking to the House of Representatives, Matson cited the impact of similar bills have had on low-income borrowers' access to credit: “Rate caps have proven to be across the country a failed exercise in big government at the expense of the same consumers we’re trying to protect.”

Based on these comments and further discussion with other lawmakers, committee member Rep. Brent Crane motioned that HB-649 be amended to address the concerns raised by Matson and Moneytree. The bill is now on the calendar to be amended on the House floor, but no further dates have been set.

== Controversy ==
Moneytree charges 430% APR on payday loans in Nevada, 460% in California, and 482% in Idaho, which has been cited as an example of a "debt trap", a loan that is difficult or impossible to repay due to high interest payments, commonly targeted mainly at low-income borrowers.

In 2005, the Seattle Post-Intelligencer and the University of Washington completed a demographic analysis which concluded payday-loan stores (including those run by Moneytree) were predominantly found in largely-black and low-income neighborhoods. Bassford has stated that Moneytree's products are not predatory in nature, but instead that "for the most part, they are [a] responsible business" and "there are people who misuse all kinds of products in society." The company also claims to promote financial literacy for customers, with Bassford saying he sponsors a group of students at the University of Washington who "deliver financial literacy in schools" though he could not recall any specific programs. Asked whether he works to improve financial education among potential clients, he said, "We're not conducting programs with our customers."

Moneytree’s Director of Government Affairs Trent Matson countered the characterization of payday loans as debt-traps in testimony to the Idaho House of Representatives. In March 2026, Matson claimed the average Moneytree loan is $300 and paid in full in 21 days. He also defended the practice as one of the few lending options available to low-income borrowers who, without services like Moneytree, would instead turn to black-market and offshore that do not disclose all of their fees upfront.

== Fines, incidents, and non-compliance ==
In 2010, Moneytree was accused of "skirting" consumer laws which prohibit borrowers from taking out more than eight payday loans in a 12-month period. When pressed by the Kitsap Sun, Bassford responded by saying that Moneytree and Washington State Department of Financial Institutions “just interpret[ed] the statute differently.”

In March 2016, Moneytree fell victim to a CEO Email scam. A scammer impersonating Bassford send an email to the payroll department requesting names, home addresses, social security numbers, birth dates, and W2 information of employees. In a letter to employees detailing the breach, Bassford said the following:

"Unfortunately, this request was not recognized as a scam, and the information about current and former Team Members who worked in the US at Moneytree in 2015 or were hired in early 2016 was disclosed. The good news is that our servers and security systems were not breached, and our millions of customer records were not affected. The bad news is that our Team Members’ information has been compromised."

In 2016, the Consumer Financial Protection Bureau fined Moneytree for deceptive advertising and collections practices spanning two incidents: in 2014 and 2015, Moneytree sent out mailers that threatened to repossess the cars and trucks of 490 customers who were delinquent on loans. Also in March 2015, Moneytree left a percent sign off of an advertisement for their check cashing services in what the CFBP called "misleading," though Moneytree insisted it was an isolated incident and purely accidental. For these incidents, the CFBP fined Moneytree $505,000: $255,000 in consumer refunds, and a civil penalty of $250,000.

== See also ==
- Alternative financial services in the United States
- Payday loans in the United States
- Predatory lending
- Washington State Department of Financial Institutions
