= CFSA =

CFSA stands for:

- Canadian Freestyle Ski Association
- Carolina Farm Stewardship Association, an organic farming advocacy group
- Skate Canada, formerly known as the Canadian Figure Skating Association
- Certified Financial Services Auditor
- Community Financial Services Association of America, an industry association for payday lenders
