= TMX =

TMX may refer to:

- TMX Group, owner of Toronto Stock Exchange and Montreal Derivatives Exchange
  - Toronto Stock Exchange (TSX)
  - Montreal Exchange (MX)
- Telmex, NYSE ticker symbol
- Tesla Model X, battery electric mid-size luxury crossover SUV
- Translation Memory eXchange file format
- Transaction Management eXecutive, old NCR system
- Tickle Me Elmo#TMX, a Sesame Street doll
- Kodak T-MAX 100 film edge marking
- Tandem Mirror Experiment
- TMX Finance, US company
- Tamoxifen, breast cancer medication
- Trimethylxanthine
- Trans Mountain Expansion Project in Trans Mountain Pipeline
- Transmashholding (ТМХ), a Russian rolling stock manufacturing company
- Honda Tricycle Motor Extreme, a line of Motorcycles in the Philippines
