= Payday loans in Canada =

Payday loans in Canada are permitted under section 347.1 of the Criminal Code, so long as the province of the borrower has enacted sufficient provincial legislation concerning the provisioning of payday loans. In the event that no such provincial legislation exists (as is the case in Newfoundland and Labrador) payday loans are limited by usury laws, with any effective (compound) rate of interest charged above 60% per annum considered criminal. However, so far this has not been enforced by Newfoundland and Labrador.

On August 14, 2006, the Supreme Court of British Columbia issued its decision in a class action lawsuit against A OK Payday Loans. A OK charged its customers 21% interest, as well as a "processing" fee of C$9.50 for every $50.00 borrowed. In addition a "deferral" fee of $25.00 for every $100.00 was charged if a customer wanted to delay payment. The judge ruled that the processing and deferral fees were interest, and that A OK was charging its customers a criminal rate of interest. The payout as a result of this decision is expected to be several million dollars. The British Columbia Court of Appeal unanimously affirmed this decision.

== Provincial regulations ==
In 2006, Parliament amended the Criminal Code to allow the provinces to regulate the payday loan industry.

Every province other than Newfoundland and Labrador has enacted some legislation to deal with payday loan restrictions since 2006.

=== Alberta ===
Alberta rates became the lowest in Canada, for provinces that allow payday loans, effective August 2016, with the maximum rate of payday loans of $15 per $100 lent, an effective interest rate of 3,724%.

The Canadian Payday Loan Association reacted by publishing "Alberta Government proposes reckless loan restrictions that will push consumers to illegal lenders."

Alberta introduced a bill to reduce the maximum rate on payday loans to $15 per $100 lent, the lowest maximum rate for provinces that allow payday loans. This will reduce the effective rate from 21,978% down to 3,724%.

=== British Columbia ===
Since November 1, 2009, the Payday Loans Regulation (under the Business Practices and Consumer Protection Act) have been in force in British Columbia. The maximum charges for short term loans have been capped at 23% of the principal (including interests and fees), the borrower can cancel the loan by the end of the following day of signing the agreement without paying any charge, only one loan per borrower at a time is permitted, and the lender's ability to access the borrower's bank or employer has been restricted. In addition, lenders are prohibited from lending more than 50 percent of a borrower's take-home pay or requiring repayment before the borrower's next payday. All lenders are required to register and are regulated under the Business Practices and Consumer Protection Authority (also known as Consumer Protection BC). In September 2016, the BC government proposed a new maximum allowable charge of $15 for every $100 borrowed- this change became effective January 1, 2017.

=== Manitoba ===
Manitoba had the most restrictive rates of any province that permits payday loans at $17 per $100 per two weeks. Additionally, any subsequent loans taken out by the same customer within a certain time period are limited to 5%.

=== New Brunswick ===
In 2018, the Province of New Brunswick implemented new regulations and a regulatory framework for licensing payday lenders. The Cost of Credit Disclosure and Payday Loans Act and the rules and regulations under this Act, which came into force on 1 January 2018, require all payday lenders to be licensed with the Financial and Consumer Services Commission (FCNB) to operate in New Brunswick; set the maximum fee on a loan at $15 per $100 borrowed; allow borrowers to cancel a loan within 48 hours at no charge; limit the number of loans that a lender can provide to a recipient at one time; and limit the loan amount to no more than 30 per cent of the recipients’ net pay, among other requirements.

=== Newfoundland and Labrador ===
Legislation was passed in 2016 but couldn't become law without the federal criminal code exemption. The exemption was given by the federal government on Wednesday, December 12, 2018. The rate is expected to be $21 per loan of $100, resulting in an effective interest rate of 14,299%.

Newfoundland and Labrador has enacted no legislation on the matter, thereby leaving any restrictions up to the federal government's cap of 60%. This would amount to a maximum charge of $2.30 per $100 for a 14-day loan. Since the effective annual interest rates on payday loans are over this limit (Alberta and Ontario with the lowest rate of $15 per $100 borrowed, (1.15^(365/14)-1)* 100)), this makes payday loans effectively illegal in the provinces. However, it appears that a payday loan industry exists in Newfoundland and Labrador, with the provincial prosecutors determining "the prosecution of those offences was not in the public interest."

=== Nova Scotia ===
Currently, lenders can charge a maximum of $17 per $100 borrowed, with maximum late payment charges of $40 and up to 30% interest on late payments. Nova Scotia used to permit payday loans at $31 per $100, this was reduced to $19 per $100 in 2018.

=== Ontario ===
Ontario has reduced to maximum rate for payday loans down to $15 per $100 loaned effective January 1, 2018, with an effective interest rate of 3,724%. Other changes will become effective July 1, 2018

"Time for Ontario to ban predatory payday loan operators: Opinion" includes a discussion of Hamilton's new regulations on the payday loan industry, a first for Ontario.

Effective January 1, 2017, the maximum total cost of borrowing for a payday loan became $18 per $100 advanced (7,383%), down from the prior rate of $21 per $100 advanced (14,299%).

On August 29, 2016, the Ministry of Government and Consumer Services is proposing to amended to the maximum total cost of borrowing from $21 per $100 advanced (14,299%) first to $18 per $100 advanced (7,383%), effective January 1, 2017; and then to $15 per $100 advanced (3,724%) effective January 1, 2018.

On June 27, 2016, the Ministry of Government and Consumer Services sent out an email stating that "after receiving second reading, it has now been referred to the Standing Committee on Social Policy." As of July 17, 2016, there are no committee meetings scheduled.

On April 20, 2016, the Ontario government issued a press release seeking input on lower rates for payday loans. The government is looking at leaving the maximum rate unchanged at 14,299% ($21 per $100 for two weeks), or lowering it to 9,224% ($19 per $100 for two weeks), lowering it to 5,894% ($17 per $100 for two weeks, or lowering it to 3,724% ($15 per $100 for two weeks). Ontario has over 800 payday lenders and loan brokers. The average payday loan in Ontario is $435 over 16 days.

The government introduced a new bill, Bill 156, Alternative Financial Services Statute Law Amendment Act, 2015 on December 9, 2015 "that will increase protections for consumers who use high-cost alternative financial services, such as payday loans, rent-to-own services, high-cost instalment loans and services to cash government issued cheques. This legislation will also better protect those with debts in collection." As of March 13, 2016, it has received first reading and is not yet law.

Ontario enacted the Payday Loans Act, 2008 to limit the fees charged on loans in Ontario to $21 per $100 borrowed for a period of two weeks. The effective annual interest rate is 14,299%((1.21^(365/14)-1)*100), while the equivalent annual simple interest rate is 548% ((0.21*(365/14))*100).

There are several agencies that outline consumer rights in Ontario, including Consumer Protection Ontario, "awareness program from Ontario's Ministry of Government and Consumer Services and other public organizations, known as administrative authorities, that promote consumer rights and public safety."

Ontarians who took out payday loans from now-defunct Cash Store or Instaloans can file claims to recover fees and interest if they file their claims by October 31, 2016 to the $10 million class-action settlement.

In February 2013 the province is attempting to revoke the licence of Edmonton-based Cash Store to operate in the province due to violations of the Act.

=== Prince Edward Island ===
Prince Edward Island has imposed a limit of fees charged on loans to $25 per $100 borrowed for a period of two weeks. The effective annual interest rate is 33,519%((1.25^(365/14)-1)*100), while the equivalent annual simple interest rate is 652% ((0.25*(365/14))*100).

=== Quebec ===
Quebec has chosen to limit the effective annual interest on all loans to 35%, effectively banning the industry from the province.

=== Saskatchewan ===
In June 2010, the government of Saskatchewan announced regulations on payday loans similar to those in British Columbia. They include an interest rate cap of 23% of the principal, a cap of 30% on a defaulted loan, and a borrowing limit of 50% of the net amount of the individual's next pay. Companies offering payday loans will be charged a licensing fee of $2,000 per location.

On January 1, 2012, The Payday Loans Act 2012 came into effect in Saskatchewan.
