= Eric Dezenhall =

American novelist (born 1962)

- Born: September 9, 1962 (age 64); Camden, New Jersey, U.S.
- Education: Dartmouth College
- Occupations: Crisis management, public relations
- Employer: Dezenhall Resources
- Title: Founder and CEO
- Website: dezenhall.com

Eric B. Dezenhall (born September 9, 1962; pronounced DEHZ-in-hall) is an American crisis management consultant, author, and founder of Washington D.C.-based public relations firm Dezenhall Resources. His aggressive tactics on behalf of his clients have made him both a target of criticism and a quoted pundit on crisis communications.

== Career ==
Born to a Jewish family in Camden, New Jersey, Dezenhall grew up in nearby Cherry Hill and Pennsauken Township. He graduated from Cherry Hill High School West and studied news media and political science at Dartmouth College. Dezenhall worked briefly in President Ronald Reagan's White House communications office. After a four-year stint at Porter Novelli, Dezenhall and boss Nick Nichols left to form Nichols-Dezenhall Communications Management Company in 1987. The company's name was shortened to Dezenhall Resources Ltd. in 2004 after Nichols retired in 2003.

== Dezenhall Resources ==
Dezenhall is founder and CEO of public relations firm Dezenhall Resources, which represents high-profile clients facing "crisis, conflict, and controversy." Dezenhall's published writing on public relations focuses on how a celebrity or corporation can successfully defend their reputation in the face of "a lawsuit, a sex scandal, a defective product, or allegations of insider trading", among other crises.

Kevin McCauley, from O'Dwyer's PR Report, regards Dezenhall "as one of the most effective in his specialty, calling him 'the pit bull of public relations.'"

=== Clients ===
Although Dezenhall does not comment on clients and contracts, Business Week reported that Dezenhall had been hired by ExxonMobil/Public Interest Watch, lawyers representing former Enron CEO Jeffrey Skilling, O'Melveny & Myers, Mark Geragos (attorney for Michael Jackson), and Eli Lilly and Company; Time identified Procter & Gamble and General Electric; and The Hill cited Community Financial Services Association of America as clients of Dezenhall.

He was contracted by the Association of American Publishers to run an up to half million dollar campaign against the open access movement. In a series of emails that were leaked to the journal Nature, Dezenhall concedes that "it's hard to fight an adversary that manages to be both elusive and in possession of a better message: Free information", and suggests joining forces with think tanks like the American Enterprise Institute in an attempt to persuade key players of the potential risks of unfiltered access. "Paint a picture of what the world would look like without peer-reviewed articles", he added. AAP CEO Patricia Schroeder praised Dezenhall and told The Washington Post that the association hired Dezenhall's firm when members realized they needed help. "We thought we were angels for a long time and we didn't need PR firms."

In 2001 as media stories about the abuse of oxycontin produced by Purdue Pharma received wide attention, Dezenhall worked for the company along with Sally Satel, an AEI Fellow, to counter the bad publicity.

== Writing ==
Dezenhall has written extensively, in news publications and through several fiction and nonfiction books. His subjects often deal with difficult and complex hidden underworlds, including organized crime and spies. He first chronicled the diaries of the late mobster Meyer Lansky in The Baltimore Sun in 2001; two years later he published Money Wanders, a fictional account of organized crime in Atlantic City, where Dezenhall spent his summers growing up. In 2011, Lansky was the main character in Dezenhall's historical fictional novel, The Devil Himself, about Lansky's work with Naval Intelligence during World War II to secure the ports in New York City against Nazi sabotage. His 2018 non-fiction book (coauthored with Gus Russo) Best of Enemies: The Last Great Spy Story of the Cold War chronicles the friendship between the KGB's Gennady Vasilenko and the CIA's Jack Platt. The book details for the first time Platt's critical role in identifying the FBI's Robert Hanssen as the mole inside the US intelligence community.

As a leading expert about crisis communications, Dezenhall wrote Nail 'em: Confronting High-Profile Attacks on Celebrities and Business and Glass Jaw; he coauthored Damage Control: Why Everything You Know About Crisis Management is Wrong.

Dezenhall's other novels include Turnpike Flameout, Shakedown Beach, Jackie Disaster, and Spinning Dixie.

== Criticism ==
In 2001, Dezenhall reportedly tangled with Bill Moyers while representing the chemical industry based on Moyers' documentary Trade Secrets. Dezenhall has been criticized for being a "spin doctor" who lowers the quality of public debate for the sake of protecting business interests. His efforts on behalf of traditional publishers to combat open access to scientific research have been an ongoing source of controversy in the academic community.

== Published works ==
=== Nonfiction ===
- Nail 'em: Confronting High-Profile Attacks on Celebrities and Business. Prometheus. 2003. ISBN 978-1-59102-047-9.
- Damage Control: Why Everything You Know About Crisis Management is Wrong. Coauthored with John Weber. Portfolio Hardcover. 2007. ISBN 978-1-59184-154-8.
- Glass Jaw: A Manifesto for Defending Fragile Reputations in an Age of Instant Scandal. Twelve. 2014. ISBN 978-1455582976.
- Best of Enemies: The Last Great Spy Story of the Cold War. Coauthored with Gus Russo: Twelve. 2018. ISBN 978-1538761311.
- Wiseguys and the White House: Gangsters, Presidents, and the Deals They Made. Harper. 2025. ISBN 978-0063390614.

=== Fiction ===
- Money Wanders. St. Martin's Griffin. 2003. ISBN 978-0-312-31134-6.
- Jackie Disaster. St. Martin's Minotaur. 2004. ISBN 978-0-312-30771-4.
- Shakedown Beach. St. Martin's Minotaur. 2005. ISBN 978-0-312-30773-8.
- Turnpike Flameout. St. Martin's Minotaur. 2005. ISBN 978-0-312-34061-2.
- Spinning Dixie. Thomas Dunne Books. 2006. ISBN 0-312-34063-X.
- The Devil Himself. Thomas Dunne Books, St. Martins. 2011. ISBN 978-0-312-66882-2.
