= Community Financial Services Association of America =

The Community Financial Services Association of America (CFSA) is a trade association in the United States representing the payday lending industry.

== Controversy ==
The payday lending industry has been the source of ongoing controversy due to its lobbying tactics and business practices that The New York Times' chief financial correspondent Floyd Norris bluntly calls "predatory lending".

=== ”Financial quicksand” ===
A central criticism of the CFSA member companies has been that payday loans are "designed to keep borrowers in debt". While payday loans are marketed as “one time” or “emergency loans”, the nonprofit Center for Responsible Lending has found that "borrowers who receive five or more loans a year account for 90 percent of the lenders’ business", and "lenders…collect 90 percent of their revenue from borrowers who cannot pay off their loans when due, rather than from one-time users dealing with short-term financial emergencies". The U.S. PIRG has documented how payday loans create a “debt cycle” through high cost rollovers, additional fees, and debt collection. Payday lending practices have fueled calls for increased governmental regulation, and several states have taken legislative action to cap interest rates or outlaw payday lending altogether. CFSA states that it is open to working with state regulators and disputes the negative impact of its lending practices.

=== Payday loans and soldiers ===
The United States Senate asked the U.S. Department of Defense to conduct a study on the impact of predatory lending on U.S. troops as a provision of the 2006 National Defense Authorization Act. When the Department of Defense submitted its report to Congress in August 2006, payday loan companies came under attack. The report found that the prominence of payday lending among U.S. servicemen and women was compromising U.S. military readiness and troop morale, and that payday lenders were specifically targeting U.S. military personnel. The CFSA disputed these findings, claiming that it only looked into the research of payday lending opponents. As a response to these and other charges, the CFSA initiated a US$10 million education and advertising campaign it claimed would help inform borrowers and improve the lending practices of its members. The CFSA hired Eric Dezenhall, a public relations specialist, to improve its image.

In 2007, the DoD created new regulations that placed a maximum limit of 36% on the annual percentage rates charged to U.S. servicemembers and their families for payday loans, vehicle title loans, and tax refund anticipation loans.

== Litigation ==
=== CFSA et al. v. CFPB et al. ===
In April 2018, CFSA, along with the Consumer Services Alliance of Texas, filed a lawsuit against the CFPB, seeking an order and judgment to hold unlawful, enjoin, and set aside the Bureau’s final small-dollar lending rule. CFSA argued that the Bureau’s rule failed to demonstrate consumer harm from small-dollar loans, ignored unbiased research and data, and relied on flawed information. Additionally, the lawsuit alleges that the rule violates the Administrative Procedure Act (APA) because it exceeds the Bureau’s statutory authority and is arbitrary, capricious, and unsupported by substantial evidence.

The district court initially stayed the rule’s compliance date while the lawsuit was ongoing. The legal challenge eventually reached the Supreme Court of the United States, which ruled 7–2 in May 2024 that the CFPB's funding structure is constitutional, ultimately resolving the lawsuit against the CFSA.

=== Advance America et al. v. Federal Deposit Insurance Corp. et al. ===
In 2014, CFSA and two of its members, Advance America and Check Into Cash, sued the Federal Deposit Insurance Commission (FDIC) and the Office of the Comptroller of the Currency (OCC). The plaintiffs alleged that federal regulators from these agencies pressured banks into terminating the accounts of lawful small-dollar lenders under the program known as Operation Choke Point, which targeted industries disfavored by the Obama administration.

The lawsuit subsequently unsealed more than 900 pages of emails and depositions demonstrating that government officials, including senior FDIC officials, targeted legal businesses including small-dollar lenders through Operation Choke Point.

The parties reached a settlement on May 22, 2019. As part of the settlement, the FDIC agreed to reiterate its policies to its staff, conduct trainings specifically related to Operation Choke Point and establish a process to allow for banks or customers to submit complaints regarding potential violations of FDIC policies.

== See also ==
- Alternative financial services in the United States
- Moneytree
