= Logbook loan =

Form of secured lending in the UK

A logbook loan is a form of secured lending in the United Kingdom and is the most common modern example of a security bill of sale. Borrowers transfer ownership of their car, van or motorcycle to the logbook lender as security for a loan. While making repayments borrowers keep possession of their vehicle and continue to use it. When the logbook loan is repaid, the borrower regains ownership of their vehicle. Borrowers hand the logbook lender the V5C registration document – or "logbook" – but this is purely symbolic and has no legal effect. If the borrower defaults, the logbook lender can seize the vehicle and look to the proceeds of sale for satisfaction of the loan. Unlike a car title loan in the United States, the logbook lender can, under English law, seize the vehicle without a court order.

In England, Wales and Northern Ireland, logbook loans are regulated by the Bills of Sale Act 1878 and Bills of Sale Act (1878) Amendment Act 1882. FCA compliant logbook lenders utilise your vehicle as security using a bill of sale, granting temporary ownership during the term of an agreed loan. However, the Bills of Sale Act 1878 has no jurisdiction in Scotland, and very few lenders are able to give loans. As a solution, a small pick of lenders have managed to lead the way forward in delivering logbook loan services to Scottish residents.

Logbook loans and the Bills of Sale Acts have been subject to much criticism. In 2009, a consultation by the Department for Business, Innovation and Skills examined the Bills of Sale Acts and proposed that bills of sale for consumer lending, such as logbook loans, should be banned. The government's response to the consultation was published in 2011. The response left the Bills of Sale Acts intact and led to the introduction of a voluntary code of practice for logbook lenders.

In 2014, the Bills of Sale Acts were once again examined, this time by the Law Commission for England and Wales. The Law Commission published its consultation paper on 9 September 2015, and a proposal for change in 2017.

== See also ==
- Title loan
- Payday loan
- Cash advance
