= Association of American Publishers =

American book-publishing trade association

The Association of American Publishers (AAP) is the national trade association of the American book publishing industry. AAP lobbies for book, journal and education publishers in the United States. AAP members include most of the major commercial publishers in the United States, as well as smaller and nonprofit publishers, university presses, and scholarly societies.

Patricia Schroeder, a former United States representative, served as the association's CEO from 1997 until 2009, taking over the role from Nicholas A. Veliotes. On May 1, 2009, another former United States representative, Tom Allen, took over as president and CEO. In January 2017, Maria Pallante, a former United States Register of Copyrights, became the president and CEO of the organization.

== Activities ==
The association's core programs deal primarily with advocacy related to: intellectual property; new technology and digital issues of concern to publishers; the freedom to read, censorship and libel; the freedom to publish; funding for education and libraries; postal rates and regulations; tax and trade policy; and international copyright enforcement.

AAP tracks publisher revenue on a monthly and annual basis with its StatShot programs. The association has also awarded books, journals, and electronic content through its annual PROSE Awards since 1976.

In August 2019, AAP sued Audible for its Captions feature, through which machine-generated text could be displayed alongside audio narration. The lawsuit was settled in February 2020, with Audible agreeing not to implement the Captions feature without obtaining express permission.

== Controversies ==
The AAP initially supported the arrest of Dmitry Sklyarov.

AAP was criticized after it contracted Eric Dezenhall's crisis management firm to promote its position regarding the open access movement. Schroeder told The Washington Post “the association hired Dezenhall when members realized they needed help. ‘We thought we were angels for a long time and we didn't need PR firms.’”

In 2020, AAP released press statements to support four of its members in the case of Hachette v. Internet Archive (IA). President Maria Pallante said of the case, "As the complaint outlines, by illegally copying and distributing online a stunning number of literary works each day, IA displays an abandon shared only by the world’s most egregious pirate sites." This action was opposed by the Electronic Frontier Foundation, Public Knowledge, and the Association of Research Libraries.

== See also ==
- American Publishers Association
- International Publishers Association
- Society for Scholarly Publishing
- Books in the United States
