= Loan shark =

Person who offers loans at extremely high interest rates

A loan shark is a person who offers loans at interest rates that are extremely high or illegal, has strict terms of collection, and generally operates outside the law, often using the threat of violence or other illegal, aggressive, and extortionate actions when seeking to enforce the satisfaction of the debt. As a consistent or repeated illegal business operation or "racket", loan sharking is generally associated with organized crime and certain criminal organizations.

== Description ==
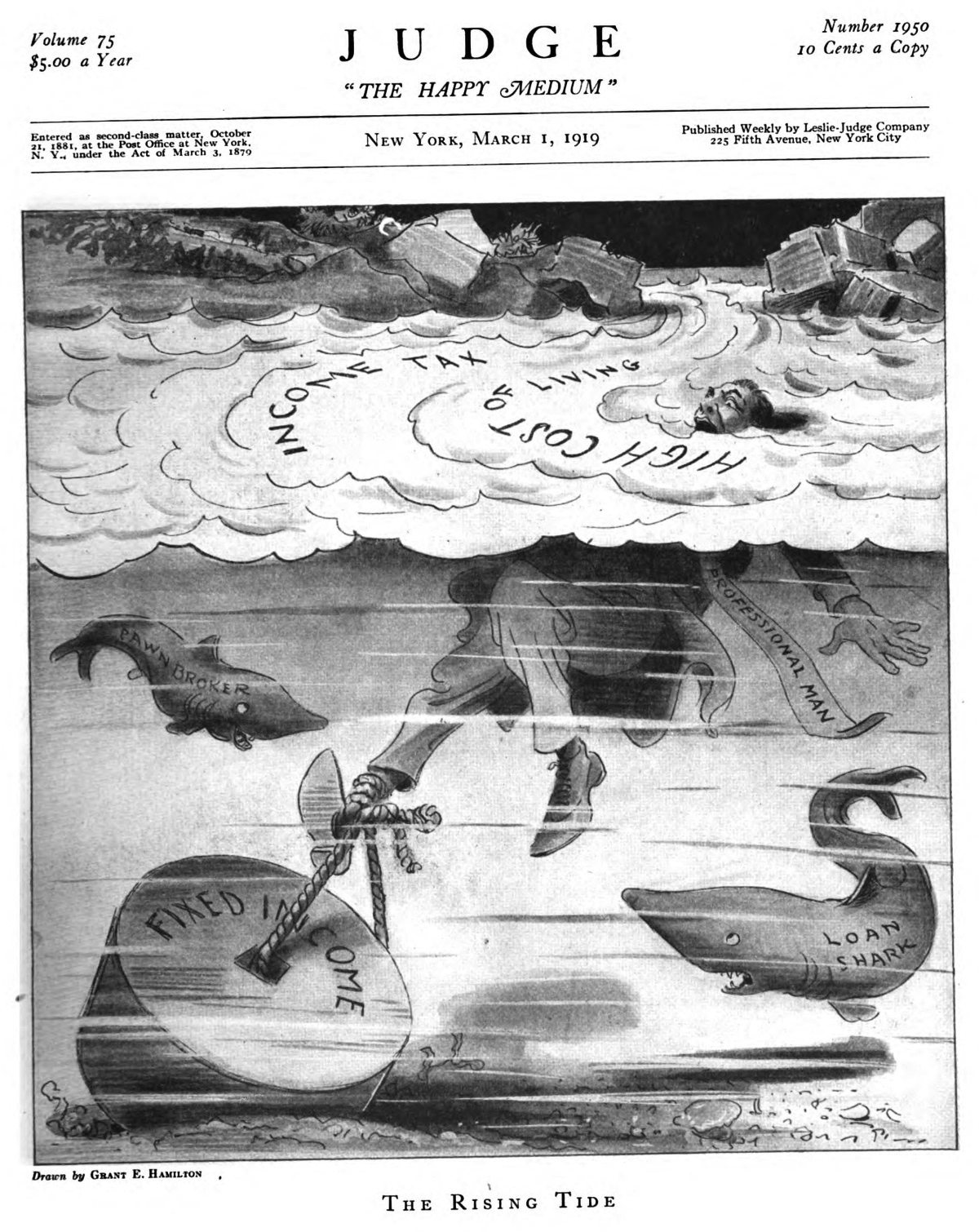
A 1919 political cartoon depicting a loan shark as a literal shark in a satirical Judge magazine

Because loan sharks operate mostly illegally, they cannot use the legal system to collect their debts; therefore they often resort to enforcing repayment by terms of blackmail and threats of violence. Historically, many moneylenders skirted between legal and criminal activity. In the recent Western world, loan sharks have been a prominent feature of the criminal underworld.

Loan sharking is sometimes conflated with lawful high interest predatory lending services such as payday or title loans. A key difference between loan sharking and predatory lending is that lenders engaged in the latter practice generally stay within the law when making and collecting loans, and thus the debate on such practices often focuses on whether they are ethical as opposed to whether they are legal. However, laws regulating lending practices vary so widely between jurisdictions (even in the same country, particularly between states in the United States) that particular practices that might be technically legal (if arguably unethical) "predatory lending" in one jurisdiction might be considered illegal "loan sharking" if attempted in an identical manner in a different locale.

== Japan ==
Regulation of moneylenders is typically much looser than that of banks. In Japan, the Moneylending Control Law requires only registration in each prefecture. In Japan, as a decades-long economic depression lingers, banks are reluctant to loan money and regulation has become tighter, meaning illegal moneylending has become a social issue. Illegal moneylenders typically charge interest of 30 or 50% in 10 days (in Japanese, these are called "to-san" (lit. 10-3) or "to-go" (lit. 10-5)), which correspond to effective interest rates of about 1.442 million percent and 267.5 million percent per annum respectively. This is against the law that sets the maximum interest rate at 20%. These lenders usually do business with those who cannot get more money from banks, legitimate consumer loans, or credit cards.

== Ireland ==
The Central Bank of Ireland was criticized for doing nothing to protect those with low incomes, the vulnerable or those who have low levels of financial literacy from loan sharks, when it emerged in 2015 that up to 100,000 of the 360,000 loans given by Irish moneylenders violated the law.

== Israel ==
Loan sharking is one of the main activities of the Israeli mafia.

== Kazakhstan ==
The National Bank of Kazakhstan has been consistently fighting loan sharks since 2018. Thus, the maximum interest rate on a loan was limited to no more than 100% of the loan amount.

In 2020, a financial market regulation agency was separated from the National Bank of Kazakhstan to monitor the rights and legitimate interests of borrowers, to identify and eliminate systemic problems of the financial sector of the economy. A unified state register of microfinance organizations was introduced to legalize lenders.

== Malaysia and Singapore ==
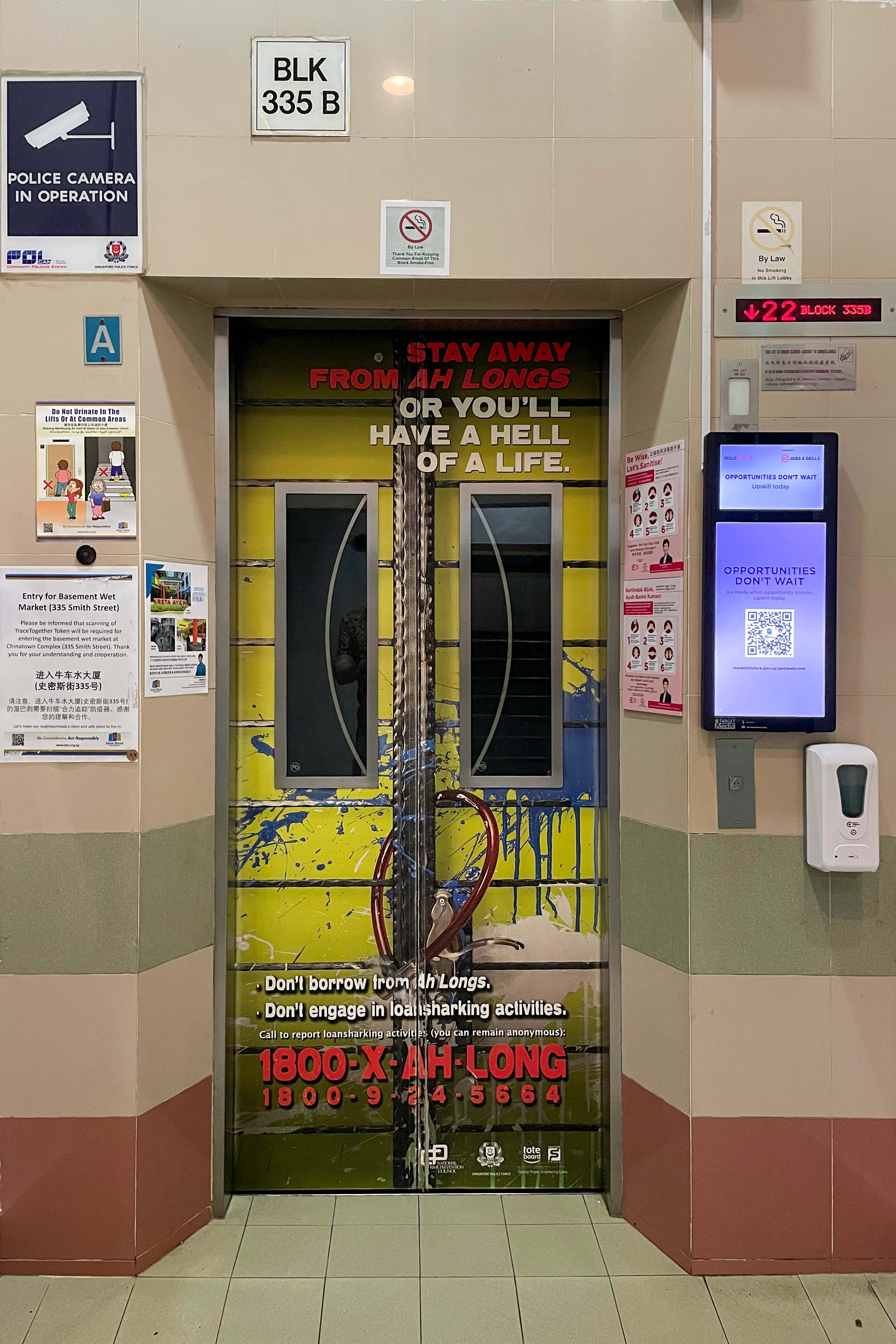
Lift door sticker awareness campaign in Singapore

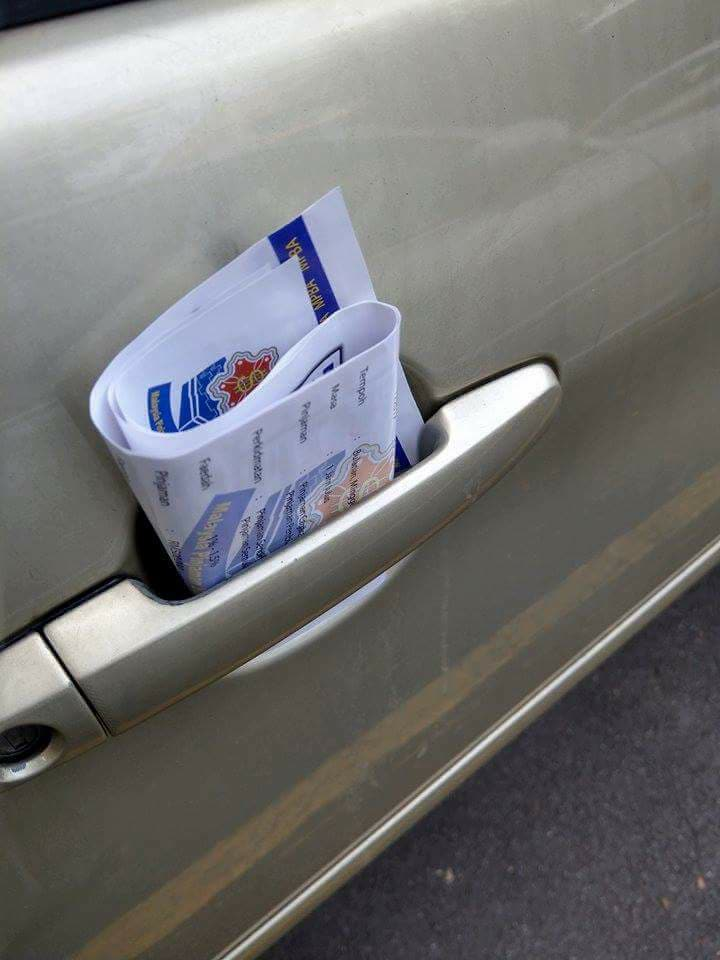
Ah Long pamphlet found in a car door handle in Malaysia

Ah Long (derived from the Cantonese phrase 大耳窿 ('big ear hole')) is a colloquial term for illegal loan sharks in Malaysia and Singapore. They lend money to people who are unable to obtain loans from banks or other legal sources, mostly targeting habitual gamblers. Often, they discreetly advertise by sticking notices, mostly on lamp posts and utility boxes around a neighbourhood, thus vandalising public property, as authorities must remove such advertisements. They charge high interest rates (generally about 40% per month/fortnight) according to Anti-Crime, Drug and Social Development Voluntary Organisation and frequently threaten violence (and administer it) towards those who fail to pay on time.

=== Ah Long tactics ===
When a person fails to pay on time, the Ah Long will set on fire, spray paint, lock up gates, splash, or write threats in paint or markers on the walls of the property of that person as a threat of violence and to scare, and perhaps shame, the borrower into repaying the loan. A common use of painting includes the characters "O$P$" meaning "owe money, pay money", as well as the debtor's unit number. According to local police authorities, there have been cases where borrowers and their family members were beaten or had their property damaged or destroyed, and some victims have committed suicide.

== New Zealand ==
During the early COVID-19 pandemic in 2020, the New Zealand Government launched a crackdown against loan sharks to ease economic hardship. Commerce Minister Kris Faafoi announced that the Credit Contracts Legislation Amendment Act 2020 was due to come into force on 1 June 2020, but the legislation was fast-tracked to 1 May due to "the disruption and financial concerns caused by COVID-19". Under the new law, high-interest lenders charging interest at 50% or more would not be allowed to charge interest as well as fees over 100% of the amount loaned to borrowers. In addition, compound interest on high interest loans was banned while fees for defaulting on payments were capped. By June 2024, figures released by the Ministry of Business, Innovation and Employment showed that no customers had been granted high-cost loans in 2023.

== Russia ==
Several organizations regulate the loan market in Russia, including:

- Central Bank
- RosComNadzor
- Self-regulated industry organization MIR

In 2024, the Central Bank planned to impose higher requirements on loan loss provisions for loans with a full value of 250% or more.

== Vietnam ==
Loan sharks in Vietnam are widespread, particularly in densely populated areas and around industrial parks. They often target poor workers and gamblers, advertising their services on walls, utility poles, and through online platforms such as Facebook and Google. Their operations range from pawn shops to online lending via illegal applications. Many of these networks are not controlled by Vietnamese citizens inside the country but are instead operated by Vietnamese living in Cambodia or Chinese groups. Loan sharks typically impose extremely high interest rates, ranging from 240% to 670% annually, with some cases reported at up to 1000% per month. Borrowers usually take relatively small loans, often below 10 million VND, but due to compounding interest, they end up owing far more than they would through official credit channels. When debtors fail to repay, loan sharks often force them to take out new loans to cover old debts, and if payments remain overdue, they resort to intimidation tactics such as sending threatening messages, vandalizing property, throwing waste or chemicals, and in some cases kidnapping or physical assault. In recent years, the Vietnamese government has intensified crackdowns on illegal lending networks and encouraged citizens not to borrow from unofficial sources, while reminding that under Article 201 of the Penal Code, usury in civil transactions is a criminal offense punishable by fines or imprisonment depending on the illicit profits gained.

== United Kingdom ==
Research by the government and other agencies estimates that 165,000 to 200,000 people are indebted to loan sharks in the United Kingdom. Illicit loan sharking is treated as a high-level crime by law enforcement, due to its links to organized crime and the serious violence involved. Payday loans with high interest rates are legal in many cases, and have been described as "legal loan sharking" (in that the creditor is legally registered, pays taxes and contributions, and can reclaim remittance if taking the case to adjudication; likewise there is no threat of harm to the debtor).

== United States ==
=== 19th-century salary lenders ===
In the late 19th-century US, low legal interest rates made small loans unprofitable, and small-time lending was viewed as irresponsible by society. Banks and other major financial institutions thus stayed away from small-time lending. There were, however, plenty of small lenders offering loans at profitable but illegally high interest rates. They presented themselves as legitimate and operated openly out of offices. They only sought customers who had a steady and respectable job, a regular income and a reputation to protect. This made them less likely to leave the area before they paid their debt and more likely to have a legitimate reason for borrowing money. Gamblers, criminals, and others who were disreputable or likely to be unreliable were avoided. They made the borrower fill out and sign seemingly legitimate contracts. Though these contracts were not legally enforceable, they at least were proof of the loan, which the lender could use to blackmail a defaulter.

To force a defaulter into paying, the lender might threaten legal action. This was a bluff, since the loan was illegal. The lender preyed on the borrower's ignorance of the law. Alternatively, the lender resorted to public shaming, exploiting the social stigma of being in debt to a loan shark. They were able to complain to the defaulter's employer, because many employers would fire employees who were mired in debt, because of the risk of them stealing from the employer to repay debts. They were able to send agents to stand outside the defaulter's home, loudly denouncing him, perhaps vandalizing his home with graffiti or notices. Whether out of gullibility or embarrassment, the borrower usually succumbed and paid.

Many customers were employees of large firms, such as railways or public works. Larger organizations were more likely to fire employees for being in debt, as their rules were more impersonal, which made blackmail easier. It was easier for lenders to learn which large organizations did this as opposed to collecting information on the multitude of smaller firms. Larger firms had more job security and the greater possibility of promotion, so employees sacrificed more to ensure they were not fired. The loan shark could also bribe a large firm's paymaster to provide information on its many employees. Regular salaries and paydays made negotiating repayment plans simpler.

The size of the loan and the repayment plan were often tailored to suit the borrower's means. The smaller the loan, the higher the interest rate was, as the overhead (costs) of tracking and pursuing a defaulter did not depend on the size of the loan. The attitudes of lenders to defaulters also varied: some were lenient and reasonable, readily granting extensions and slow to harass, while others unscrupulously tried to milk all they could from the borrower (e.g. imposing late fees).

Because salary lending was a disreputable trade, the owners of these firms often hid from public view, hiring managers to run their offices indirectly. To further avoid attracting attention, when expanding his trade to other cities, an owner would often found new firms with different names rather than increasing the visibility and recognizability of his existing firm.

The penalties for being an illegal lender were mild. Illegal lending was a misdemeanor, and the penalty was forfeiture of the interest and perhaps the principal as well. But these punishments were only ever imposed if the borrower sued, which they typically could not afford to do.

Opposition to salary lenders was spearheaded by social elites, such as businessmen and charity organizations. Businessmen were encouraged not to fire employees who were indebted to loan sharks so that the loan sharks could not blackmail their debtors ("pay up or we'll tell your boss that you're a deadbeat and you'll be fired"). Charities provided legal support to troubled borrowers. This fight culminated in the drafting of the Uniform Small Loan Law, which brought into existence a new class of licensed lender. The law was enacted, first in several states in 1917, and was adopted by all but a handful of states by the middle of the 20th century. The model statute mandated consumer protections and capped the interest rate on loans of $300 or less at 3.5% a month (51% a year), still a profitable level for small loans. Lenders had to give the customer copies of all signed documents. Additional charges such as late fees were banned. The lender could no longer receive power of attorney or confession of judgment over a customer. These licensing laws made it impossible for usurious lenders to pass themselves off as legal. Small loans also started becoming more socially acceptable, and banks and other larger institutions started offering them as well.

=== 20th-century gangsters ===
In the 1920s and 1930s, American prosecutors began to notice the emergence of a new breed of illegal lender that used violence to enforce debts. The new small lender laws had made it almost impossible to intimidate customers with a veneer of legality, and many customers were less vulnerable to shaming because they were either self-employed or already disreputable. Thus, violence was an important tool, though not their only one. These loan sharks operated more informally than salary lenders, which meant more discretion for the lender and less paperwork and bureaucracy for the customer. They were also willing to serve high-risk borrowers that legal lenders would not touch.

Threats of violence were rarely followed through, however. One possible reason is that injuring a borrower could have meant he could not work and thus could never pay off his debt. Many regular borrowers realized the threats were mostly bluffs and that they could get away with delinquent payments. A more certain consequence was that the delinquent borrower would be cut off from future loans, which was serious for those who regularly relied on loan sharks.

One important market for violent loan sharks was illegal gambling operators, who could not expose themselves to the law to collect debts legally. They cooperated with loan sharks to supply credit and collect payments from their punters. Thieves and other criminals, whose fortunes were frequently in flux, were also served, and these connections also allowed the loan sharks to operate as fences. Another type of high-risk customer was the small businessman in dire financial straits who could not qualify for a legal loan.

Violent loan sharking was typically run by criminal syndicates, such as the Mafia and Irish Mob. Many of these were former bootleggers who needed a new line of work after the end of alcohol prohibition. Towards the 1960s, loan sharks grew ever more coordinated, and could pool information on borrowers to better size up risks and ensure a borrower did not try to pay off one loan by borrowing from another loan shark. The fearsome reputation of a criminal organization made the loan shark's threat of violence more credible.

=== Mafia links ===
==== Origins in "salary buying", 1920s criminalization ====
Although the reform law was intended to starve the loan sharks into extinction, this species of predatory lender thrived and evolved. After high-rate salary lending was outlawed, some bootleg vendors recast the product as "salary buying". They claimed they were not making loans but were purchasing future wages at a discount. This form of loan sharking proliferated through the 1920s and into the 1930s until a new draft of the Uniform Small Loan Law closed the loophole through which the salary buyers had slipped. Salary-buying loan sharks continued to operate in some Southern states after World War II because the usury rate was set so low that licensed personal finance companies could not do business there.

==== Post-criminalization ====
Organized crime began to enter the cash advance business in the 1930s, after high-rate lending was criminalized by the Uniform Small Loan Law. The first reports of mob loan sharking surfaced in New York City in 1935, and for 15 years, underworld money lending apparently did not expand beyond that city. There is no record of syndicate "juice" operations in Chicago, for instance, until the 1950s.

In the beginning, underworld loan sharking was a small loan business, catering to the same populations served by the salary lenders and buyers. Those who turned to the bootleg lenders could not get credit at licensed companies because their incomes were too low or they were deemed poor risks. Firms operating within the usury cap turned away roughly half of all applicants and tended to make larger loans to married men with steady jobs and decent incomes.

Those who could not get a legal loan at 36% or 42% a year could secure a cash advance from a mobster at the going rate of 10% or 20% a week for small loans. Since the mob loans were not usually secured with legal instruments, debtors pledged their bodies as collateral.

In its early phase, a large fraction of mob loan sharking consisted of payday lending. Many of the customers were office clerks and factory hands. The loan fund for these operations came from the proceeds of the numbers racket and was distributed by the top bosses to the lower echelon loan sharks at the rate of 1% or 2% a week. The 1952 B movie Loan Shark, starring George Raft, offers a glimpse of mob payday lending. The waterfront in Brooklyn was another site of extensive underworld payday advance operations around mid-century.

==== 1960s heyday–present ====
Over time, mob loan sharks moved away from such labor-intensive rackets. By the 1960s, the preferred clientele was small and medium-sized businesses. Business customers had the advantage of possessing assets that could be seized in case of default or used to engage in fraud or to launder money. Gamblers were another lucrative market, as were other criminals who needed financing for their operations. By the 1970s, mob salary lending operations seemed to have withered away in the United States.

At its height in the 1960s, underworld loan sharking was estimated to be the second most lucrative franchise of organized crime in the United States after illegal gambling. Newspapers in the 1960s were filled with sensational stories of debtors beaten, harassed, and sometimes murdered by mob loan sharks. Yet careful studies of the business have raised doubts about the frequency with which violence was employed in practice. Relations between creditor and debtor could be amicable, even when the "vig" or "juice" was exorbitant, because each needed the other. FBI agents in one city interviewed 115 customers of a mob loan business but turned up only one debtor who had been threatened. None had been beaten.

=== Non-mafia sharks ===
Organized crime has never had a monopoly on black market lending. Plenty of vest-pocket lenders operated outside the jurisdiction of organized crime, charging usurious rates of interest for cash advances. These informal networks of credit rarely came to the attention of the authorities but flourished in populations not served by licensed lenders. Even today, after the rise of corporate payday lending in the United States, unlicensed loan sharks continue to operate in immigrant enclaves and low-income neighborhoods. They lend money to people who work in the informal sector or who are deemed to be too risky even by the check-cashing creditors. Some beat delinquents while others seize assets instead. Their rates run from 10% to 20% a week, as was common with the mob in the past.

=== Non-standard lenders in the United States ===
In the United States, there are lenders licensed to serve borrowers who cannot qualify for standard loans from mainstream sources. These smaller, non-standard lenders often operate in cash, whereas mainstream lenders increasingly operate only electronically and will not serve borrowers who do not have bank accounts. Terms such as sub-prime lending, "non-standard consumer credit", and payday loans are often used in connection with this type of consumer finance. The availability of these services has made illegal, exploitative loan sharks rarer, but these legal lenders have also been accused of behaving in an exploitative manner. For example, payday loan operations have come under fire for charging inflated "service charges" for their services of cashing a "payday advance", effectively a short-term (no more than one or two weeks) loan for which charges may run 3–5% of the principal amount. By claiming to be charging for the "service" of cashing a paycheck, instead of merely charging interest for a short-term loan, laws that strictly regulate moneylending costs can be effectively bypassed.

=== Payday lending ===
Licensed payday advance businesses, which lend money at high rates of interest on the security of a postdated check, are often described as loan sharks by their critics due to high interest rates that trap debtors, stopping short of illegal lending and violent collection practices. Today's payday loan is a close cousin of the early 20th century salary loan, the product to which the "shark" epithet was originally applied, but they are now legalised in some states.

A 2001 comparison of short-term lending rates charged by the Chicago Outfit organized crime syndicate and payday lenders in California revealed that, depending on when a payday loan was paid back by a borrower (generally 1–14 days), the interest rate charged for a payday loan could be considerably higher than the interest rate of a similar loan made by an organized crime syndicate. However, the violent collection practices of organized crime can ensure a lower rate of unpaid loans. The absence of taxes further reduces the cost of lending in this case.

== See also ==
- Debt bondage
- Debt of developing countries
- Financial literacy
- Mortgage discrimination
- Organized crime
- Overdraft protection loans
- Payday loan
- Poverty industry
- Refund anticipation loan
- Securitization
- Settlement (finance)
- Title loan
- Usury
