= Alternative financial service =

Financial service provided outside traditional banking institutions

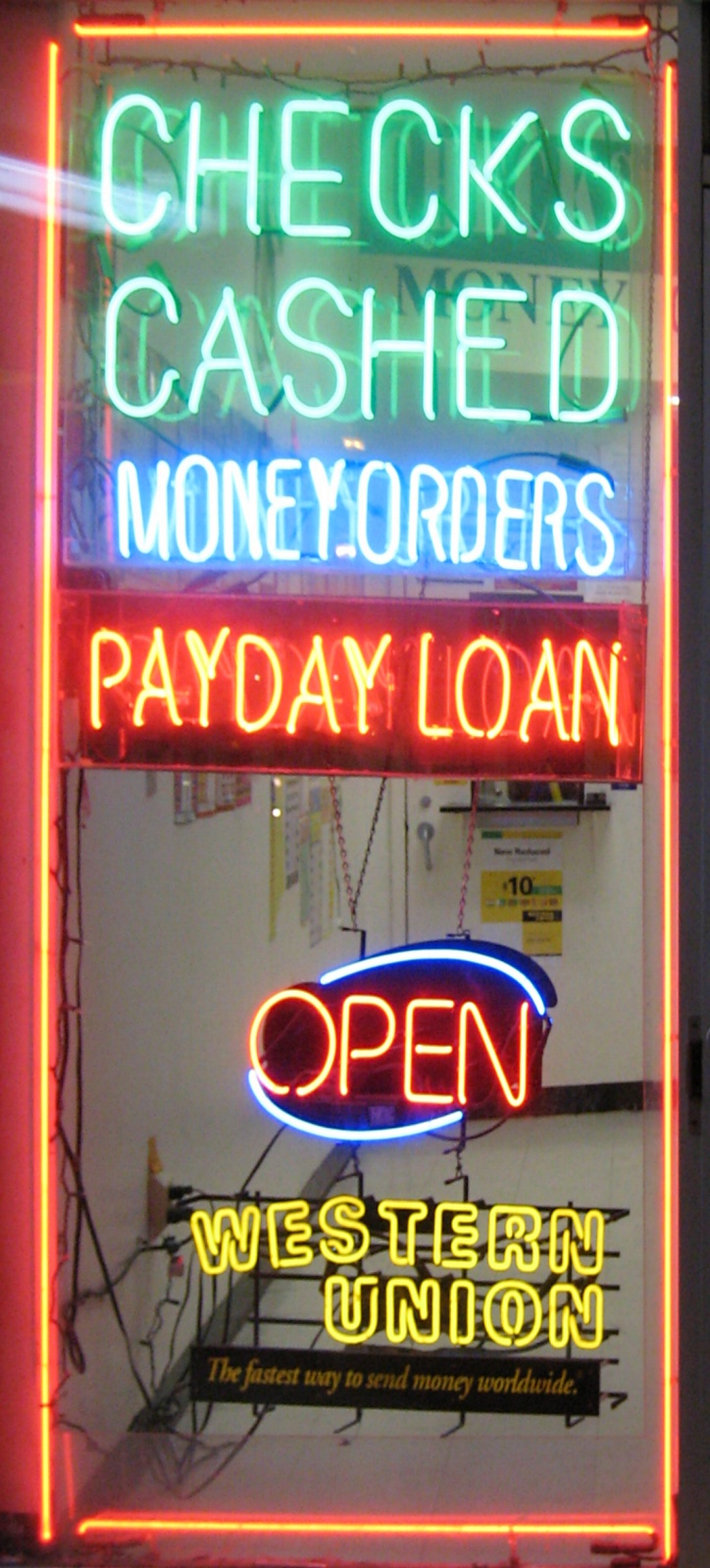
A shop window in Falls Church, Virginia.

An alternative financial service (AFS) is a financial service provided outside traditional banking institutions, on which many low-income individuals depend. In developing countries, these services often take the form of microfinance. In developed countries, the services may be similar to those provided by banks and include payday loans, rent-to-own agreements, pawnshops, refund anticipation loans, some subprime mortgage loans and car title loans, and non-bank check cashing, money orders, and money transfers. It also includes traditional moneylending by door-to-door collection. In New York City, these are called check-cashing stores, and they are legally exempted from the 25 percent criminal usury cap.

Alternative financial services are typically provided by non-bank financial institutions, although person-to-person lending and crowd funding also play a role. A 2004 report estimated that alternative financial service providers handled about 280 million transactions a year, generating roughly $78 billion in fee revenue. Customers include the unbanked.

== United States ==
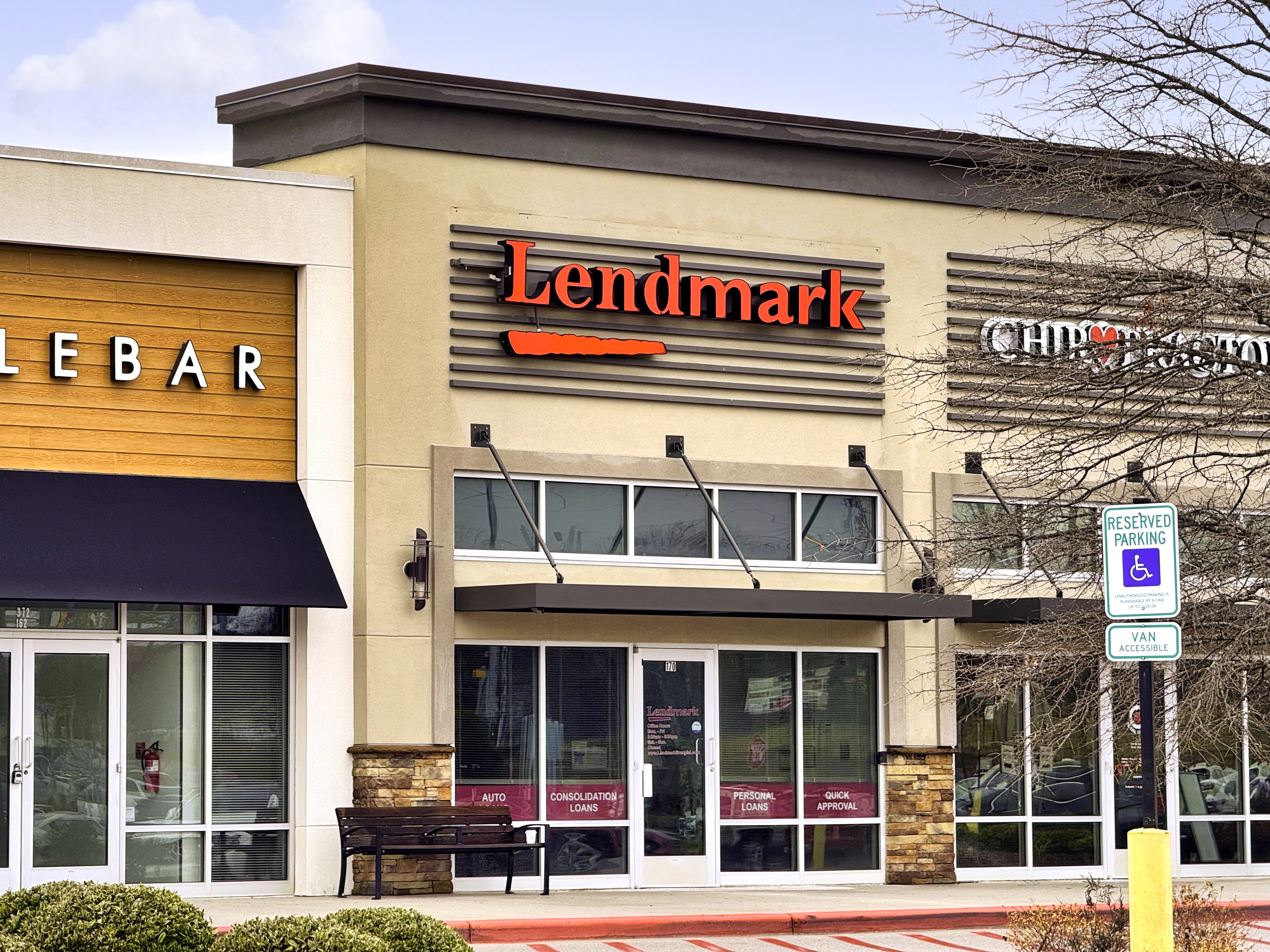
Lendmark Financial Services in Chattanooga, Tennessee

Alternative financial services in the United States, for example via payday loans, are more extensive than in some other countries, because the major banks in the U.S. are less willing to lend to people with marginal credit ratings than their counter parties in many other countries.

Americans that use non-traditional lenders to meet short-term financial needs include almost ten million households that are unbanked or underbanked, according to a 2004 study prepared for The Fannie Mae Foundation by the Urban Institute Metropolitan Housing and Communities Policy Center, "Alternative Financial Service Providers." The study states that a vast majority of borrowers who utilize small-dollar online loans like payday loans tend to use them for regular, recurring expenses as opposed to unexpected financial emergencies. Many borrowers who take advantage of such subprime lending options tend to have low credit scores or limited credit backgrounds, and a vast majority of those who utilize alternative loans online like payday loans tend earn an annual income of $40,000 or less.

== United Kingdom ==
In the United Kingdom, alternative financial services include payday loans and money lending, the latter termed "home collected credit", "home credit" or "doorstep loans". Organizations such as Debt on our Doorstep campaign for improved regulation.

The Financial Conduct Authority (FCA) took over regulation of consumer credit, including high-cost short-term credit, from the Office of Fair Trading on 1 April 2014. From 2 January 2015 the FCA introduced a price cap on high-cost short-term credit, comprising an initial cost cap of 0.8% per day of the amount borrowed, a £15 cap on default fees, and a total cost cap of 100%, so that a borrower never repays more in interest and fees than the amount originally borrowed. A 2017 review by the regulator found the cap had saved around 760,000 borrowers approximately £150 million a year, and the FCA maintained it at its existing level.

== Canada ==
In Canada, alternative financial services include payday loans and money lending. They are regulated according to each province. Many lenders use Instant Bank Verification (IBV).

Section 347 of the Criminal Code sets a criminal rate of interest. On 1 January 2025 this was reduced from an effective annual rate of 60% to an annual percentage rate of 35%. The accompanying Criminal Interest Rate Regulations provide exemptions for certain commercial, pawnbroking and payday loans. Payday loans, which are regulated provincially, became subject to a federal limit on the total cost of borrowing of CA$14 per CA$100 advanced in provinces with an approved payday lending regime.

== See also ==
- Community Financial Services Association of America
- Debt bondage
- Debt of developing countries
- Guarantor loan
- Informal value transfer system
- Loan shark
- Mortgage discrimination
- Overdraft protection loans
- Payday loan
- Poverty industry
- Refund anticipation loan
- Sarakin
- Securitization
- Settlement (finance)
- Title loan
- Underbanked
- Usury
