= Title loan =

Secured loan using borrower's vehicle title as collateral

A title loan (also known as a car title loan) is a type of secured loan where borrowers can use their vehicle title as collateral. Borrowers who get title loans must allow a lender to place a lien on their car title, and temporarily surrender the hard copy of their vehicle title, in exchange for a loan amount. When the loan is repaid, the lien is removed and the car title is returned to its owner. If the borrower defaults on their payments then the lender is liable to repossess the vehicle and sell it to repay the borrower's outstanding debt.

These loans are typically short-term and tend to carry higher interest rates than other sources of credit. Lenders typically do not check the credit history of borrowers for these loans and only consider the value and condition of the vehicle that is being used to secure it. Despite the secured nature of the loan, lenders argue that the comparatively high rates of interest that they charge are necessary. As evidence for this, they point to the increased risk of default on a type of loan that is used almost exclusively by borrowers who are already experiencing financial difficulties.

Most title loans can be acquired in 15 minutes or less on loan amounts as little as $100. Most other financial institutions will not loan under $1,000 to someone without any credit as they deem these not profitable and too risky. In addition to verifying the borrower's collateral, many lenders verify that the borrower is employed or has some source of regular income. The lenders do not generally consider the borrower's credit score.

== History ==
Title loans first emerged in the early 1990s and opened a new market to individuals with poor credit and have grown increasingly popular, according to studies by the Center for Responsible Lending and Consumer Federation of America. They are the cousin of unsecured loans, such as payday loans. Since borrowers use their car titles to secure the loans, there’s risk that the borrower can lose their vehicle by defaulting on their payments due to personal circumstances or high interest rates, which almost always have APR in the triple digits—what are sometimes called “balloon payments”.

Alternative title lending exists in many states known as car title pawn or auto pawn as they are called. Similar to a traditional car title loan, a car title pawn uses both the car title and the physical vehicle (which is usually stored by the lender) to secure the loan much like any secured loan works, and there are the same risk and factors involved for the borrower but in most cases they will receive more cash in the transaction since the lender has both the vehicle and title in their possession.

== Process ==
A borrower will seek the services of a lender either online or at a store location. In order to secure the loan the borrower will need to have certain forms of identification such as a valid government-issued ID like a driver’s license, proof of income, some form of mail to prove residency, car registration, a lien-free car title in their name, references, and car insurance, though not all states require lenders to show proof of auto insurance.

The maximum amount of the loan is determined by the collateral. Typical lenders will offer up to half of the car's resale value, though some will go higher. Most lenders use Kelley Blue Book to find the resale value of vehicles. The borrower must hold clear title to the car; this means that the car must be paid in full with no liens or current financing. Most lenders will also require the borrower to have full insurance on the vehicle.

Depending on the state where the lender is located, interest rates may range from 36% to well over 100%. Payment schedules vary but at the very least the borrower has to pay the interest due at each due date. At the end of the term of the loan, the full outstanding amount may be due in a single payment. If the borrower is unable to repay the loan at this time, then they can roll the balance over, and take out a new title loan. Government regulation often limits the total number of times that a borrower can roll the loan over, so that they do not remain perpetually in debt.

If the borrower cannot pay back the loan or is late with his or her payments, the title loan lender may seek to take possession of the car and sell it to offset what is owed. Typically, lenders choose this option as a last resort because it may take months to recover the vehicle, and repossession, auction, and court costs all decrease the amount of money they are able to recoup. During this time, the lender is not collecting payments yet the vehicle is depreciating. Most states require the title loan lender to hold the vehicle for 30 days to allow the borrower to recover it by paying the balance. Typically, any amount from the sale over the existing loan balance is returned to the defaulter.

Today, the internet has revolutionized how companies can reach their clientele, and many title loan companies offer online applications for pre-approval or approval on title loans. These applications require much of the same information and still may require a borrower to visit a store to pick up their money, usually in the form of a check. When filling out these applications, they may ask for things like the vehicle's Vehicle Identification Number (VIN) and/or insurance policy numbers.

== Loan calculation ==
The amount a borrower can be loaned is dependent on the worth of their vehicle. A lender will typically look up the auction value of the car being used as collateral and offer a loan that’s between 30% and 50% of the worth of the vehicle. This leaves lenders a cushion to make profit if ever they need to repossess the vehicle and sell it at auction, in the event the borrower defaults.

== States offering title loans ==
Title loans are not offered in all states. Some states have made them illegal because they are considered a welfare-reducing provision of credit, or predatory lending. Other states, like Montana, have begun placing strict regulations on title loans by not allowing the APR to reach above 36%, down from the previous 400%. However, Montana has recently voted against allowing title loans in the state. In 2008, New Hampshire passed a law capping APR at 36%. Some companies claim their average loan amounts to be between $300 and $500, and had to shut down their store fronts in that state, or their business entirely, because their business could not survive on a low APR for low loan amounts. Since then, the law has been reversed and new growth in the title loan industry has emerged, allowing title loan lenders to charge 25% interest a month, or roughly 300% APR. States continue to vote on legislation allowing or disallowing title loans. Some states have no limit on the APR that title loan companies can charge, while others continue to crack down and push for stricter regulation. Early in 2012, Illinois recently voted to cap APR on title loans at 36%, with other provisions that would limit the title loan industry in the state. The vote did not pass, but voters and politicians in Illinois and other states continue in their convictions to regulate or outlaw title loans.

The California State Assembly passed a law in 2020 that set an interest rate cap on all loans from $2,500-$10,000 with that title loans were included. In 2020 California State Assembly set a 30% cap on all auto title loans of at less than $2,500.

== Demographic of small-dollar-credit consumers ==
Small-dollar-credit (SDC) refers to services offered by payday and title loan industries. In 2012, a study was conducted by the Center for Financial Services Innovation. According to the study, SDC consumers are generally less educated, have more children, and are based in the South, where there is a greater concentration of unbanked or underbanked people. In addition, there’s a healthy spread of SDC consumers with a range of salaries—showing 20% of SDC consumers have a household income between $50,000 and $75,000. However, 45% of respondents to the survey would classify themselves as “poor”.

== Criticism ==
Critics of title loans contend that the business model seeks and traps impoverished individuals with ridiculous interest rates by lenders who aren’t entirely transparent regarding the payments. This practice lends confusion and so some borrowers are unaware of the situation that getting a small-dollar-credit loan puts them in. However, they are already locked in the loan and have no means of escaping other than paying the loan off or losing their vehicle.

The practice has been compared to loan sharking, because the interest rates are so high.

Even though states are placing stringent restrictions on things like interest rates that can be charged, regulating the practices of companies offering short-term loans, like payday loans or title loans, proves to be a difficult endeavor. The Consumer Financial Protection Bureau and the Federal Trade Commission, both federal regulatory agencies responsible for enforcing federal law with non-banking institutions, admit that they do not have the authority to enforce the Military Lending Act, which states that military members and their families can pay an APR no higher than 36%, while banning loans to service members that would be secured through their banking accounts, vehicles, or paychecks.

Some lenders can move around the Military Lending Act's restrictions by offering open-ended credit loans instead of title loans or payday loans. This allows them to continue charging triple-digit APR on their loans.

Some groups, such as the Texas Fair Lending Alliance, present title loans and payday loans as a form of entrapment, where taking out one of these means that borrowers will find themselves cycling further into debt with less chances of getting out of debt when compared to not taking the loan out at all, contending that 75% of payday loans are taken out within two weeks of the previous loan in order to fill the gap in finances from when the loan was originally taken out. In 2001, Texas passed a law capping interest rates on title loans and payday loans. However, lenders are getting around the restrictions by exploiting loopholes allowing them to lend for the same purposes, with high-interest rates, disguised as loan brokers or as a Credit Services Organization (CSO).

The Vice President of state policy at the Center for Responsible Lending in Durham, North Carolina argues that the car title loan model is built around loans that are impossible to repay. He goes on to cite a 2007 study by the Center for Responsible Lending which shows that 20% of title loan borrowers in Chicago had taken out a loan in order to repay a previous loan to the same lender.

Evidence from The Pew Charitable Trusts cites a need for consumers to be better informed. The Pew report states that of the more than 2 million consumers who obtain title loans, one out of nine consumers default on their loans, and notes that repossession affects approximately 5 to 9 percent of borrowers who default.

== See also ==
- Alternative financial services
- Electronic lien and title
- Loan shark
- Logbook loan
- Predatory lending
