= Payday loan =

Short-term unsecured loan

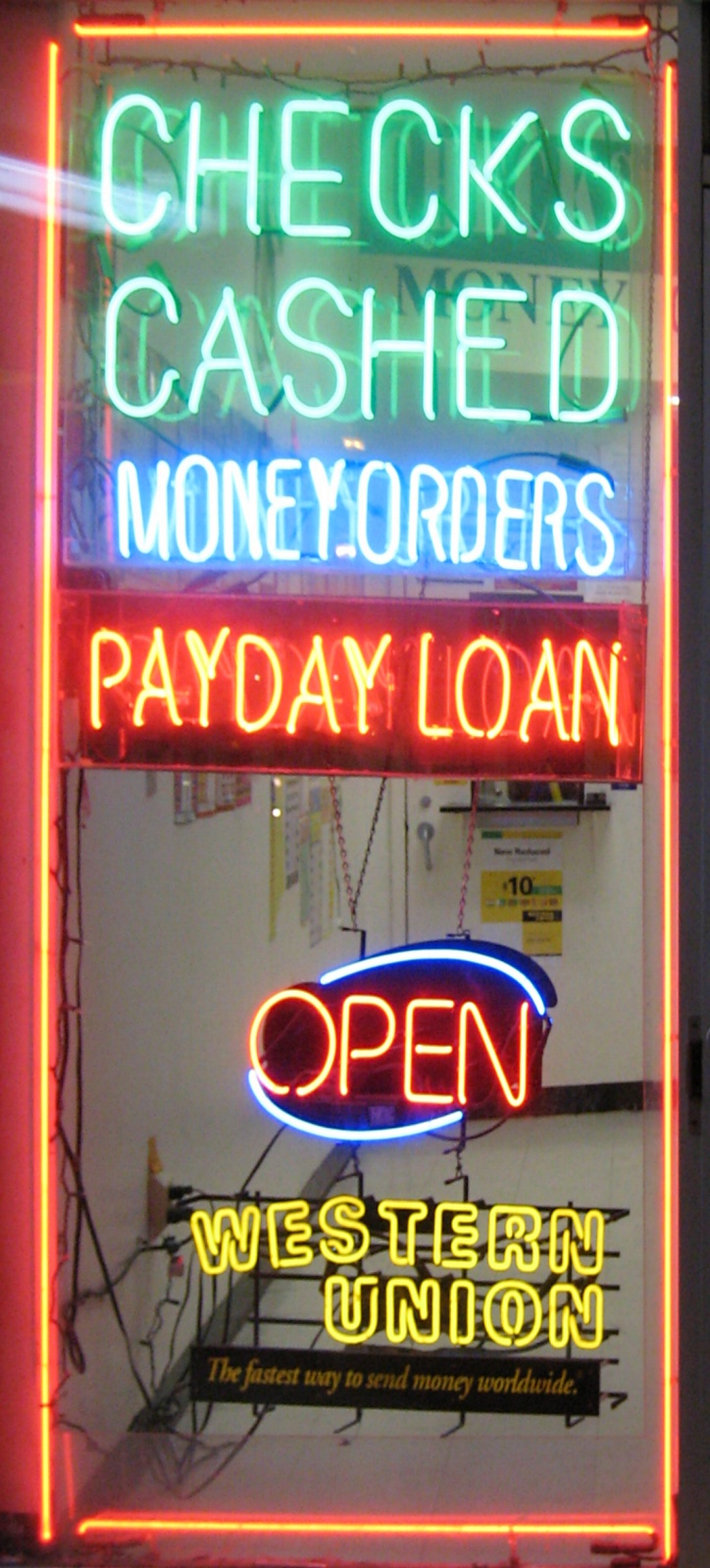
A shop window in Falls Church, Virginia, advertising payday loans.

A payday loan is a short-term unsecured loan, often characterized by high interest rates. These loans are typically designed to cover immediate financial needs and are intended to be repaid on the borrower's next payday.

The term "payday" in payday loan refers to when a borrower writes a postdated check to the lender for the payday salary, but receives part of that payday sum in immediate cash from the lender. However, in common parlance, the concept also applies regardless of whether repayment of loans is linked to a borrower's payday. The loans are also sometimes referred to as "cash advances", though that term can also refer to cash provided against a prearranged line of credit such as a credit card. Legislation regarding payday loans varies widely between different countries, and in federal systems, between different states or provinces.

To prevent usury (unreasonable and excessive rates of interest), some jurisdictions limit the annual percentage rate (APR) that any lender, including payday lenders, can charge. Some jurisdictions outlaw payday lending entirely, while others have very few restrictions on payday lenders.

Payday loans have been linked to higher default rates.

== Terminology ==
These services may also be called a payday advance, salary loan, payroll loan, small dollar loan, short term, or cash advance loan.

== History ==
According to a 2007 study by economist Michael A. Stegman, payday loan firms were extremely rare prior to the 1990s, but have grown substantially since then.

=== Impact ===
A 2019 study found that payday loans in the United States "increase personal bankruptcy rates by a factor of two ... by worsening the cash flow position of the household." A second 2019 study looking at the UK found that payday loans "cause persistent increases in defaults and cause consumers to exceed their bank overdraft limits."

== Loan process ==
The basic loan process involves a lender providing a short-term unsecured loan to be repaid at the borrower's next payday. Typically, some verification of employment or income is involved (via pay stubs and bank statements), although according to one source, some payday lenders do not verify income or run credit checks. Individual companies and franchises have their own underwriting criteria.

In the traditional retail model, borrowers visit a payday lending store and secure a small cash loan, with payment due in full at the borrower's next paycheck. The borrower writes a postdated check to the lender in the full amount of the loan plus fees. On the maturity date, the borrower is expected to return to the store to repay the loan in person. If the borrower does not repay the loan in person, the lender may redeem the check. If the account is short on funds to cover the check, the borrower may now face a bounced check fee from their bank in addition to the costs of the loan, and the loan may incur additional fees or an increased interest rate (or both) as a result of the failure to pay.

In the more recent innovation of online payday loans, consumers complete the loan application online (or in some instances via fax, especially where documentation is required). The funds are then transferred by direct deposit to the borrower's account, and the loan repayment and/or the finance charge is electronically withdrawn on the borrower's next payday.

== User demographics and reasons for borrowing ==
According to a 2012 study by The Pew Charitable Trusts, "Most payday loan borrowers [in the United States] are white, female, and are 25 to 44 years old. However, after controlling for other factors, there are five groups that have higher odds of having used a payday loan: those without a four-year college degree; home renters; African Americans; those earning below $40,000 annually; and those who are separated or divorced." Most borrowers use payday loans to cover ordinary living expenses over the course of months, not unexpected emergencies over the course of weeks. The average borrower is indebted about five months of the year.

This reinforces the findings of the U.S. Federal Deposit Insurance Corporation (FDIC) study from 2011 which found black and Hispanic families, recent immigrants, and single parents were more likely to use payday loans. In addition, their reasons for using these products were not as suggested by the payday industry for one time expenses, but to meet normal recurring obligations.

Research for the Illinois Department of Financial and Professional Regulation found that a majority of Illinois payday loan borrowers earn $30,000 or less per year. Texas' Office of the Consumer Credit Commissioner collected data on 2012 payday loan usage, and found that refinances accounted for $2.01 billion in loan volume, compared with $1.08 billion in initial loan volume. The report did not include information about annual indebtedness. A letter to the editor from an industry expert argued that other studies have found that consumers fare better when payday loans are available to them. Pew's reports have focused on how payday lending can be improved, but have not assessed whether consumers fare better with or without access to high-interest loans. Pew's demographic analysis was based on a random digit dialing survey of 33,576 people, including 1,855 payday loan borrowers.

In another study, by Gregory Elliehausen, Division of Research of the Federal Reserve System and Financial Services Research Program at the George Washington University School of Business, 41% earn between $25,000 and $50,000, and 39% report incomes of $40,000 or more. 18% have an income below $25,000.

== Criticism ==
In the UK Sarah-Jayne Clifton of the Jubilee Debt Campaign said, "austerity, low wages, and insecure work are driving people to take on high cost debt from rip-off lenders just to put food on the table. We need the government to take urgent action, not only to rein in rip-off lenders, but also to tackle the cost of living crisis and cuts to social protection that are driving people towards the loan sharks in the first place."

=== Draining money from low-income communities ===
The likelihood that a family will use a payday loan increases if they are unbanked or underbanked, or lack access to a traditional deposit bank account. In an American context the families who will use a payday loan are disproportionately either of black or Hispanic descent, recent immigrants, and/or undereducated. These individuals are least able to secure normal, lower interest rate forms of credit. Since payday lending operations charge higher interest rates than traditional banks (with some exceptions), they have the effect of depleting the assets of low-income communities. The Insight Center, a consumer advocacy group, reported in 2013 that payday lending cost U.S communities $774 million a year.

A report from the Federal Reserve Bank of New York concluded that, "We ... test whether payday lending fits our definition of predatory. We find that in states with higher payday loan limits, less educated households and households with uncertain income are less likely to be denied credit, but are not more likely to miss a debt payment. Absent higher delinquency, the extra credit from payday lenders does not fit our definition of predatory." The caveat to this is that with a term of under 30 days there are no payments, and the lender is more than willing to roll the loan over at the end of the period upon payment of another fee. The report goes on to note that payday loans are extremely expensive, and borrowers who take a payday loan are at a disadvantage in comparison to the lender, a reversal of the normal consumer lending information asymmetry, where the lender must underwrite the loan to assess creditworthiness.

A 2012 law journal note summarized the justifications for regulating payday lending. The summary notes that while it is difficult to quantify the impact on specific consumers, there are external parties who are clearly affected by the decision of a borrower to get a payday loan. Most directly impacted are the holders of other low interest debt from the same borrower, which now is less likely to be paid off since the limited income is first used to pay the fee associated with the payday loan. The external costs of this product can be expanded to include the businesses that are not patronized by the cash-strapped payday customer to the children and family who are left with fewer resources than before the loan. The external costs alone, forced on people given no choice in the matter, may be enough justification for stronger regulation even assuming that the borrower him or herself understood the full implications of the decision to seek a payday loan.

Payday lenders have also been criticized for perpetuating a cycle of debt in their users as they leave people with less money overall. While most payday loans advertise themselves as "the solution to life's little surprises", this is rarely the case; 69% of payday loans are taken out to cover everyday recurring expenses such as electricity bills, gas, or groceries. This perpetuates the cycle of debt as payday borrowers are more likely to resort to payday loans again once they are charged with the same recurring expense in the next few months.

=== Advertising practices ===
In May 2008, the debt charity Credit Action made a complaint to the United Kingdom Office of Fair Trading (OFT) that payday lenders were placing advertising which violated advertising regulations on the social network website Facebook. The main complaint was that the APR was either not displayed at all or not displayed prominently enough, which is clearly required by UK advertising standards.

In 2016, Google announced that it would ban all ads for payday loans from its systems, defined as loans requiring repayment within 60 days or (in the US) having an APR of 36% or more.

=== Unauthorized clone firms ===
In August 2015, the Financial Conduct Authority (FCA) of the United Kingdom has announced that there has been an increase of unauthorized firms, also known as 'clone firms', using the name of other genuine companies to offer payday loan services. Therefore, acting as a clone of the original company, such as the case of Payday Loans Now. The FCA strongly advised to verify financial firms by using the Financial Services Register, prior to participating in any sort of monetary engagement.

=== Aggressive collection practices ===
In US law, a payday lender can use only the same industry standard collection practices used to collect other debts, specifically standards listed under the Fair Debt Collection Practices Act (FDCPA). The FDCPA prohibits debt collectors from using abusive, unfair, and deceptive practices to collect from debtors. Such practices include calling before 8 o'clock in the morning or after 9 o'clock at night, or calling debtors at work.

In many cases, borrowers write a post-dated check to the lender; if the borrowers do not have enough money in their account by the check's date, their check will bounce. In Texas, payday lenders are prohibited from suing a borrower for theft if the check is post-dated. One payday lender named The Money Center in the state instead gets their customers to write checks dated for the day the loan is given. Customers borrow money because they do not have any, so the lender accepts the check knowing that it would bounce on the check's date. If the borrower fails to pay on the due date, the lender sues the borrower for writing a hot check.

Payday lenders will attempt to collect on the consumer's obligation first by simply requesting payment. If internal collection fails, some payday lenders may outsource the debt collection, or sell the debt to a third party.

A small percentage of payday lenders have, in the past, threatened delinquent borrowers with criminal prosecution for check fraud. This practice is illegal in many jurisdictions and has been denounced by the Community Financial Services Association of America, the industry's trade association.

=== Pricing structure of payday loans ===
The payday lending industry argues that conventional interest rates for lower dollar amounts and shorter terms would not be profitable. For example, a $100 one-week loan, at a 20% APR (compounded weekly) would generate only 38 cents of interest, which would fail to match loan processing costs. Research shows that, on average, payday loan prices moved upward, and that such moves were "consistent with implicit collusion facilitated by price focal points".

According to some consumer advocates and industry experts, such as the Consumer Financial Protection Bureau (CFPB), the Office of Fair Trading (OFT), and The Pew Charitable Trusts, payday loans are an example of a classic market failure. In a perfect market, sellers and buyers compete rationally and prices vary based on the market capacity, forcing rates towards lenders' costs; prime lending markets function largely in this manner. However, payday loans diverge from this model in two ways. First, the loans themselves are generally small sums with fixed origination costs, resulting in a high annualized interest rate on paper. Secondly, and more fundamentally, payday loan customers typically borrow due to financial distress and are less likely to shop for alternatives, favoring speed and access over cost. As a result, demand for payday loans is generally price-inelastic. Payday lenders thus have little incentive to compete on price, as lowering their rates or fees would sacrifice margin instead of attracting new customers. As a result, lenders charge the maximum amount allowed by law, which can be as high as 400% annual percentage rate (APR).

Payday lending markets also suffer from adverse selection. High rates on payday loans disproportionately attract customers who are more prone to default. Distressed borrowers have lower capacity to repay, and may have lower financial literacy, as well as private information (related to, for instance, job performance) making them more likely to accept a loan which they cannot pay back. Indeed, one study had 29% of borrowers report taking out a loan which they knew they could not afford. This high rate of default produces an upward pressure on interest rates to compensate, which in turn attracts more borrowers with high default risk. In a well-functioning market, this phenomenon is self-limiting, as lenders would eventually take losses at a sufficiently high default rate. However, payday loans have high fixed origination costs, so lenders often extend further loans to borrowers on the verge of default, rolling over the existing debt onto a new loan with a new origination fee. This allows repeat lending to be profitable on its own, so the usual brake does not function in the payday lending market.

== Proponents' stance and counterarguments ==
=== Industry profitability ===
In a profitability analysis by Fordham Journal of Corporate & Financial Law, it was determined that the average profit margin from seven publicly traded payday lending companies (including pawn shops) in the U.S. was 7.63%, and for pure payday lenders it was 3.57%. These averages are less than those of other traditional lending institutions such as credit unions and banks.

Comparatively the profit margin of Starbucks for the measured time period was just over 9%, and comparison lenders had an average profit margin of 13.04%. These comparison lenders were mainstream companies: Capital One, GE Capital, HSBC, Moneytree, and American Express Credit.

=== Charges are in line with costs ===
A study by the FDIC Center for Financial Research found that "operating costs are not that out of line with the size of advance fees" collected and that, after subtracting fixed operating costs and "unusually high rate of default losses", payday loans "may not necessarily yield extraordinary profits."

However, despite the tendency to characterize payday loan default rates as high, several researchers have noted that this is an artifact of the normal short term of the payday product, and that during the term of loans with longer periods there are frequently points where the borrower is in default and then becomes current again. Actual charge offs are no more frequent than with traditional forms of credit, as the majority of payday loans are rolled over into new loans repeatedly without any payment applied to the original principal.

The propensity for very low default rates seems to be an incentive for investors interested in payday lenders. In the Advance America 10-k SEC filing from December 2011 they note that their agreement with investors, "limits the average of actual charge-offs incurred during each fiscal month to a maximum of 4.50% of the average amount of adjusted transaction receivables outstanding at the end of each fiscal month during the prior twelve consecutive months". They go on to note that for 2011 their average monthly receivables were $287.1 million and their average charge-off was $9.3 million, or 3.2%. In comparison with traditional lenders, payday firms also save on costs by not engaging in traditional forms of underwriting, relying on their easy rollover terms and the small size of each individual loan as method of diversification eliminating the need for verifying each borrower's ability to repay. It is perhaps due to this that payday lenders rarely exhibit any real effort to verify that the borrower will be able to pay the principal on their payday in addition to their other debt obligations.

=== Markets provide services otherwise unavailable ===
Proponents of minimal regulations for payday loan businesses argue that some individuals that require the use of payday loans have already exhausted other alternatives. Such consumers could potentially be forced to illegal sources if not for payday loans. Tom Lehman, an advocate of payday lending, said:

... payday lending services extend small amounts of uncollateralized credit to high-risk borrowers, and provide loans to poor households when other financial institutions will not. Throughout the past decade, this "democratization of credit" has made small loans available to mass sectors of the population, and particularly the poor, that would not have had access to credit of any kind in the past.

These arguments are countered in two ways. First, the history of borrowers turning to illegal or dangerous sources of credit seems to have little basis in fact according to Robert Mayer's 2012 "Loan Sharks, Interest-Rate Caps, and Deregulation". Outside of specific contexts, interest rates caps had the effect of allowing small loans in most areas without an increase of "loan sharking". Next, since 80% of payday borrowers will roll their loan over at least one time because their income prevents them from paying the principal within the repayment period, they often report turning to friends or family members to help repay the loan according to a 2012 report from the Center for Financial Services Innovation. In addition, there appears to be no evidence of unmet demand for small dollar credit in states which prohibit or strictly limit payday lending.

A 2012 report produced by the American libertarian think tank Cato Institute found that the cost of the loans is overstated, and that payday lenders offer a product traditional lenders simply refuse to offer. However, the report is based on 40 survey responses collected at a payday storefront location. The report's author, Victor Stango, was on the board of the Consumer Credit Research Foundation (CCRF), an organization funded by payday lenders, until 2015, and he received $18,000 in payments from CCRF in 2013.

=== Household welfare increased ===
A staff report released by the Federal Reserve Bank of New York concluded that payday loans should not be categorized as "predatory" since they may improve household welfare. "Defining and Detecting Predatory Lending" reports "if payday lenders raise household welfare by relaxing credit constraints, anti-predatory legislation may lower it." The author of the report, Donald P. Morgan, defined predatory lending as "a welfare reducing provision of credit". However, he also noted that the loans are very expensive, and that they are likely to be made to under-educated households or households of uncertain income.

Brian Melzer of the Kellogg School of Management at Northwestern University found that payday loan users did suffer a reduction in their household financial situation, as the high costs of repeated rollover loans impacted their ability to pay recurring bills such as utilities and rent. This assumes a payday user will rollover their loan rather than repay it, which has been shown both by the FDIC and the Consumer Finance Protection bureau in large sample studies of payday consumers.

Petru Stelian Stoianovici, a researcher from Charles River Associates, and Michael T. Maloney, an economics professor from Clemson University, found "no empirical evidence that payday lending leads to more bankruptcy filings, which casts doubt on the debt trap argument against payday lending."

The report was reinforced by a Federal Reserve Board (FRB) 2014 study which found that while bankruptcies did double among users of payday loans, the increase was too small to be considered significant. The same FRB researchers found that payday usage had no positive or negative impact on household welfare as measured by credit score changes over time.

=== Aid in disaster areas ===
A 2011 study found that in natural disaster areas where payday loans were readily available consumers fared better than those in disaster zones where payday lending was not present. Not only were fewer foreclosures recorded, but such categories as birth rate were not affected adversely by comparison. Moreover, Morse's study found that fewer people in areas served by payday lenders were treated for drug and alcohol addiction.

== Country-specific ==
=== Australia ===
Prior to 2009 regulation of consumer credit was primarily conducted by the states and territories. Some states such as New South Wales and Queensland legislated effective annual interest rate caps of 48%. In 2008 the Australian states and territories referred powers of consumer credit to the Commonwealth. In 2009 the National Consumer Credit Protection Act 2009 (Cth) was introduced, which initially treated payday lenders no differently from all other lenders. In 2013 Parliament tightened regulation on the payday lending further introducing the Consumer Credit and Corporations Legislation Amendment (Enhancements) Act 2012 (Cth) which imposed an effective APR cap of 48% for all consumer credit contracts (inclusive of all fees and charges). Payday lenders who provided a loan falling within the definition of a small amount credit contract (SACC), defined as a contract provided by a non authorised-deposit taking institution for less than $2,000 for a term between 16 days and 1 year, are permitted to charge a 20% establishment fee in addition to monthly (or part thereof) fee of 4% (effective 48% p.a.). Payday lenders who provide a loan falling within the definition of a medium amount credit contract (MACC), defined as a credit contract provided by a non-deposit taking institution for between $2,000–$5,000 may charge a $400 establishment fee in addition to the statutory interest rate cap of 48%. Payday lenders are still required to comply with Responsible lending obligations applying to all creditors. Unlike other jurisdictions Australian payday lenders providing SACC or MACC products are not required to display their fees as an effective annual interest rate percentage.

=== Canada ===
Bill C28 supersedes the Criminal Code of Canada for the purpose of exempting Payday loan companies from the law, if the provinces passed legislation to govern payday loans. Payday loans in Canada are governed by the individual provinces. All provinces, except Newfoundland and Labrador, have passed legislation. For example, in Ontario loans have a maximum rate of 14.299% Effective Annual Rate (EAR) ($21 per $100, over two weeks). As of 2017, major payday lenders have reduced the rate to $18 per $100, over two weeks.

=== United Kingdom ===
The Financial Conduct Authority (FCA) estimates that there are more than 50,000 credit firms that come under its widened remit, of which 200 are payday lenders. Payday loans in the United Kingdom are a rapidly growing industry, with four times as many people using such loans in 2009 compared to 2006 – in 2009 1.2 million people took out 4.1 million loans, with total lending amounting to £1.2 billion. In 2012, it is estimated that the market was worth £2.2 billion and that the average loan size was around £270. Two-thirds of borrowers have annual incomes below £25,000. There are no restrictions on the interest rates payday loan companies can charge, although they are required by law to state the effective annual percentage rate (APR). In the early 2010s there was much criticism in Parliament of payday lenders.

In 2014 several firms were reprimanded and required to pay compensation for illegal practices; Wonga.com for using letters untruthfully purporting to be from solicitors to demand payment—a formal police investigation for fraud was being considered in 2014—and Cash Genie, owned by multinational EZCorp, for a string of problems with the way it had imposed charges and collected money from borrowers who were in arrears.

==== Changes in the UK law ====
On 1 April 2014 there was a major overhaul in the way payday loans are issued and repaid.

First of all the FCA made sure all lenders can abide by two main goals:

- to ensure that firms only lend to borrowers who can afford it
- to increase borrowers' awareness of the cost and risk of borrowing unaffordably and ways to help if they have financial difficulties

On top of the main goals Martin Wheatley, the FCA's chief executive officer, said:

"For the many people that struggle to repay their payday loans every year this is a giant leap forward. From January next year, if you borrow £100 for 30 days and pay back on time, you will not pay more than £24 in fees and charges and someone taking the same loan for fourteen days will pay no more than £11.20. That’s a significant saving.
"For those who struggle with their repayments, we are ensuring that someone borrowing £100 will never pay back more than £200 in any circumstance.
"There have been many strong and competing views to take into account, but I am confident we have found the right balance.
"Alongside our other new rules for payday firms – affordability tests and limits on rollovers and continuous payment authorities – the cap will help drive up standards in a sector that badly needs to improve how it treats its customers."

In order to achieve these goals the FCA has proposed the following:

- Initial cost cap of 0.8% per day
- Fixed default fees capped at £15
- Total cost cap of 100%

=== United States ===
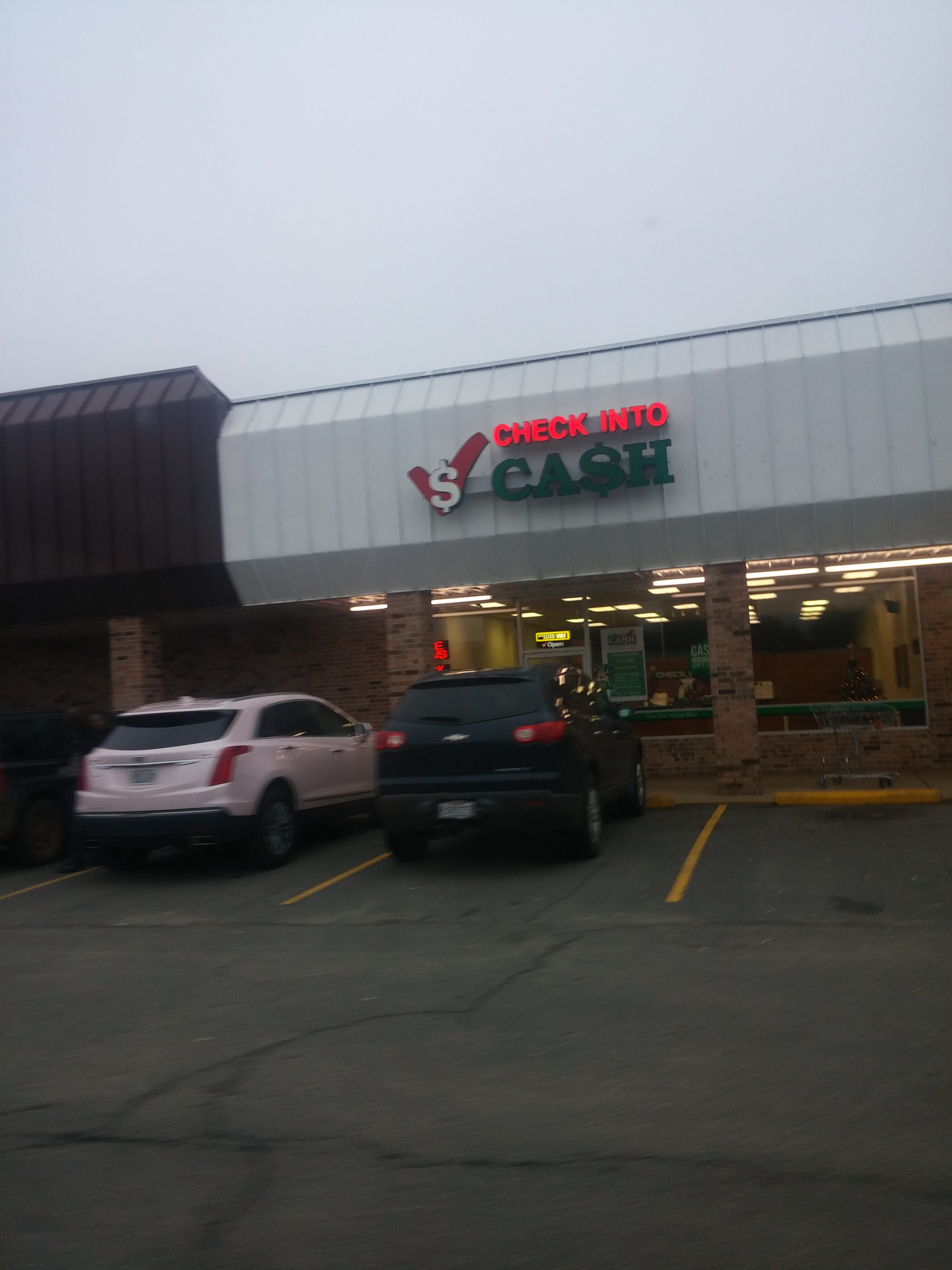
Check Into Cash, the largest payday loan company in the United States

In the United States, the rates of these loans used to be restricted in most states by the Uniform Small Loan Laws (USLL), with 36–40% APR generally the norm.

Payday loans are as of 2014 legal in 27 states, and 9 others allows some form of short term storefront lending with restrictions. The remaining 14 and the District of Columbia forbid the practice. The annual percentage rate (APR) is also limited in some jurisdictions to prevent usury. Some states limit the number of loans a borrower can take at a single time.

As for federal regulation, the Dodd–Frank Wall Street Reform and Consumer Protection Act gave the Consumer Financial Protection Bureau (CFPB) specific authority to regulate all payday lenders, regardless of size. The Military Lending Act imposes a 36% rate cap on tax refund loans and certain payday and auto title loans made to active duty armed forces members and their covered dependents, and prohibits certain terms in such loans.

The CFPB has issued several enforcement actions against payday lenders for reasons such as violating the prohibition on lending to military members and aggressive collection tactics. The CFPB also operates a website to answer questions about payday lending. In addition, some states have aggressively pursued lenders they felt violate their state laws.

Payday lenders have made effective use of the sovereign status of Native American reservations, often forming partnerships with members of a tribe to offer loans over the Internet which evade state law. However, the Federal Trade Commission has begun to aggressively monitor these lenders as well. While some tribal lenders are operated by Native Americans, there is also evidence many are simply a creation of so-called "rent-a-tribe" schemes, where a non-Native company sets up operations on tribal land.

== Variations and alternatives ==
=== Alternatives to payday loans ===
Other options are available to most payday loan customers. These include pawnbrokers, credit union loans with lower interest and more stringent terms which take longer to gain approval, employee access to earned but unpaid wages, credit payment plans, paycheck cash advances from employers ("advance on salary"), auto pawn loans, bank overdraft protection, cash advances from credit cards, emergency community assistance plans, small consumer loans, installment loans and direct loans from family or friends. The Pew Charitable Trusts found in 2013 their study on the ways in which users pay off payday loans that borrowers often took a payday loan to avoid one of these alternatives, only to turn to one of them to pay off the payday loan.

If the consumer owns their own vehicle, an auto title loan would be an alternative for a payday loan, as auto title loans use the equity of the vehicle as the credit instead of payment history and employment history.

Other alternatives include the Pentagon Federal Credit Union Foundation (PenFed Foundation) Asset Recovery Kit (ARK) program.

Basic banking services are also often provided through their postal systems.

=== Comparisons payday lenders make ===
Payday lenders do not compare their interest rates to those of mainstream lenders. Instead, they compare their fees to the overdraft, late payment, penalty fees and other fees that will be incurred if the customer is unable to secure any credit whatsoever.

The lenders may list a different set of alternatives (with costs expressed as APRs for two-week terms, even though these alternatives do not compound their interest or have longer terms):

- $100 payday advance with a $15 fee = 391% APR
- $100 bounced check with $54 NSF/merchant fees = 1,409% APR
- $100 credit card balance with a $37 late fee = 965% APR
- $100 utility bill with $46 late/reconnect fees = 1,203% APR

=== Variations on payday lending ===
A minority of mainstream banks and TxtLoan companies lending short-term credit over mobile phone text messaging offer virtual credit advances for customers whose paychecks or other funds are deposited electronically into their accounts. The terms are similar to those of a payday loan; a customer receives a predetermined cash credit available for immediate withdrawal. The amount is deducted, along with a fee, usually about 10 percent of the amount borrowed, when the next direct deposit is posted to the customer's account. After the programs attracted regulatory attention, Wells Fargo called its fee "voluntary" and offered to waive it for any reason. It later scaled back the program in several states. Wells Fargo currently offers its version of a payday loan, called "Direct Deposit Advance", which charges 120% APR. Similarly, the BBC reported in 2010 that controversial TxtLoan charges 10% for seven-days advance which is available for approved customers instantly over a text message.

Income tax refund anticipation loans are not technically payday loans (because they are repayable upon receipt of the borrower's income tax refund, not at his next payday), but they have similar credit and cost characteristics. A car title loan is secured by the borrower's car, but are available only to borrowers who hold clear title (i.e., no other loans) to a vehicle. The maximum amount of the loan is some fraction of the resale value of the car. A similar credit facility seen in the UK is a logbook loan secured against a car's logbook, which the lender retains. These loans may be available on slightly better terms than an unsecured payday loan, since they are less risky to the lender. If the borrower defaults, then the lender can attempt to recover costs by repossessing and reselling the car.

=== Postal banking ===
Many countries offer basic banking services through their postal systems. The United States Post Office Department offered such a service, called the United States Postal Savings System, but it was discontinued in 1967. In January 2014 the Office of the Inspector General of the United States Postal Service issued a white paper suggesting that the USPS could offer banking services, to include small dollar loans for under 30% APR. Support and criticism quickly followed; opponents of postal banking argued that as payday lenders would be forced out of business due to competition.

== See also ==
- Alternative financial services
- Community Financial Services Association of America, a trade association representing the payday loan industry
- Debt bondage
- Loan shark
- Logbook loan
- Merchant cash advance
- Predatory lending
- Refund anticipation loan
- Title loan
- Usury
