= Corruption in Uzbekistan =

Corruption in Uzbekistan is a serious problem. There are laws in place to prevent corruption, but enforcement in terms of laws regarding corruption is very weak. Low prosecution rates of corrupt officials is another contributing factor to the rampant corruption in Uzbekistan. It is not a criminal offense for a non-public official to influence the discretion of a public official. The judicial system faces severe functional deficits due to limited resources and corruption.

In Uzbekistan, corruption is present at virtually every level of society, business, and government. It is also one of the world's most corrupt countries, and among the contributory factors is its possessing the second largest economy in Central Asia, its large reserves of natural gas, and its geographical position between the rival powers (USA and Russia) of the so-called Second Cold War.

Transparency International's 2025 Corruption Perceptions Index, published in early 2026, scored 182 countries on a scale from 0 ("highly corrupt") to 100 ("very clean"). Uzbekistan received a score of 31. When ranked by score, Uzbekistan ranked 124th among the 182 countries in the Index, where the country ranked first is perceived to have the most honest public sector. For comparison with regional scores, the best score among Eastern European and Central Asian countries (Note: Albania, Armenia, Azerbaijan, Belarus, Bosnia and Herzegovina, Georgia, Kazakhstan, Kosovo, Kyrgyzstan, Moldova, Montenegro, North Macedonia, Russia, Serbia, Tajikistan, Turkey, Turkmenistan, Ukraine, and Uzbekistan) was 50, the average score was 34 and the worst score was 17. For comparison with worldwide scores, the best score was 89 (ranked 1), the average score was 42, and the worst score was 9 (ranked 181, in a two-way tie).

Transparency International wrote in early 2024 that although Uzbekistan's authoritarian government resists progress in combatting corruption, and although Uzbekistan's score remains below the global and regional averages, steady and significant progress has nonetheless been made: Uzbekistan's score on the Corruption Perceptions Index improved every year between 2013 and 2023, from 17 to 33 (it has since declined to 32 in 2024 and 31 in 2025). Transparency International wrote, "Key steps include creating an anti-corruption agency, strengthening legislation and liberalising the economy. Importantly, policies and procedures have been established to enforce these laws and criminal charges have been filed against numerous corrupt officials. The government also introduced stronger internal control and audit tools in various ministries and local government offices, such as anti-bribery management systems."

"Graft and bribery among low and mid-level officials are part of everyday life and are sometimes even transparent," stated Freedom House in 2015. Freedom House added that the ubiquity of corruption helped to "limit equality of opportunity."

A 2015 report by Amnesty International quotes a businessman who was arrested and tortured in 2011, as saying that corruption in Uzbekistan is a "cancer that had spread everywhere."

== Corruption in government ==
Bribery, nepotism, and extortion are common throughout the Uzbek public sector.

=== Presidential power ===
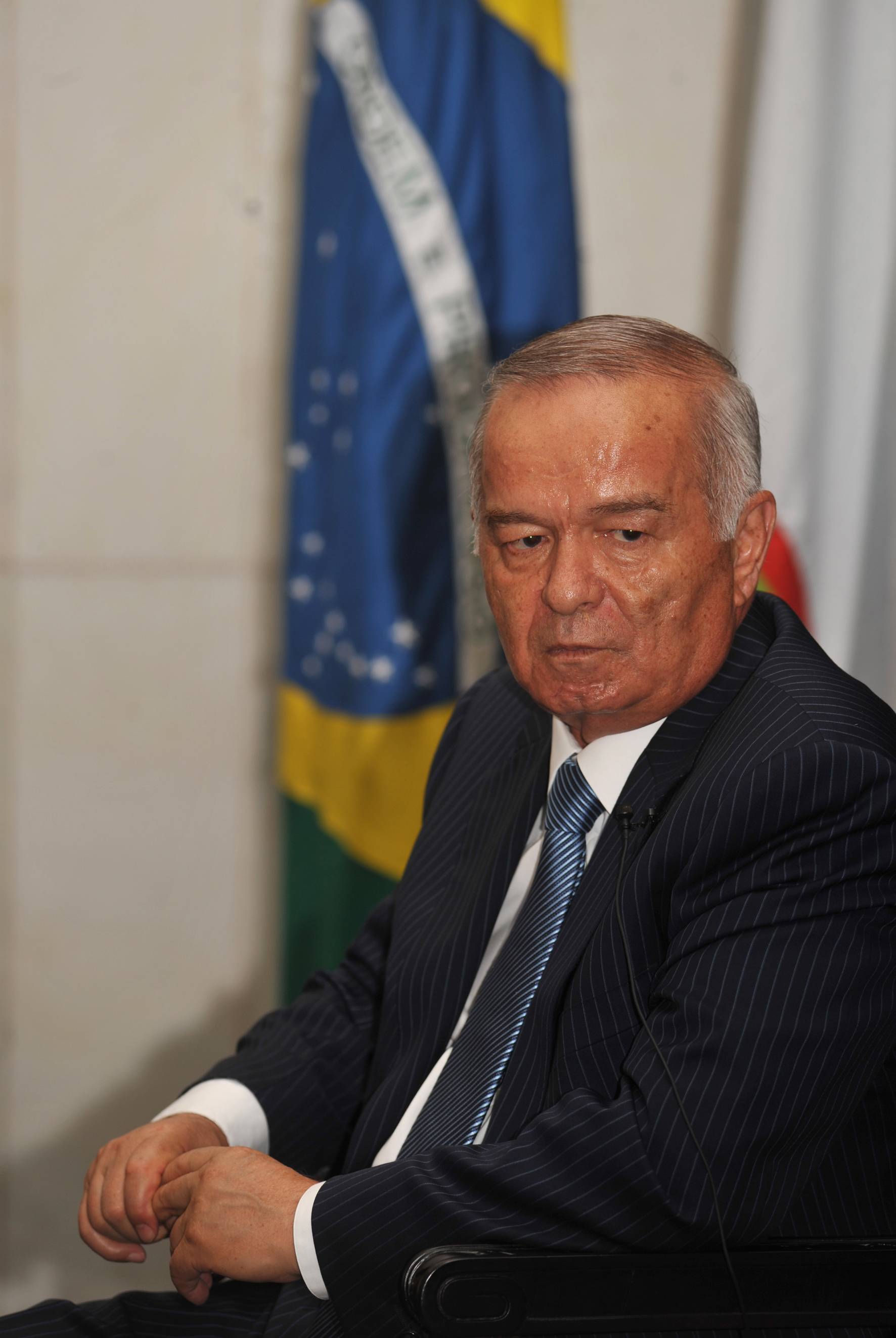
Former president Islam Karimov

Uzbek artist Vyacheslav Okhunov told Der Spiegel in 2015 that the late Islam Karimov, then Uzbekistan's president, was "a dictator" who exhibited Mafioso tendencies. Karimov has been accused of ruling Uzbekistan with an iron fist for a quarter-century, shaping a culture that "has a greater resemblance to North Korea than China." Critics have sardonically noted that there is almost no televised news broadcast that does not feature Karimov "cutting a ribbon for some new facility somewhere". According to The Heritage Foundation, Karimov's absolute power extended to judicial appointments.

Freedom House has reported that Karimov exercised total power over the legislature, which acts as a "rubber stamp" that approved Karimov's decisions. The group states that Karimov's virtually absolute power allowed him to exploit every sphere of activity in his country for personal economic benefit.

Even after his death in office in September 2016, Karimov's influence remained firm enough to allow his handpicked successor, Prime Minister Shavkat Mirziyoyev, to be acting President pending the December 2016 Presidential by-election in blatant disregard to the Constitution, which places that responsibility at the hands of the President of the Senate.

=== Gulnara Karimova telecom corruption scandal ===
The president's daughter, Gulnara Karimova, has (like the president himself) been associated with large-scale corruption. A Swiss criminal investigation begun in 2012 was directed at first against four Uzbek citizens who had connections to Karimova. Two of them were arrested that year and released on bail. Also in 2012, a Swedish television documentary stated that a Swedish telecommunications company, TeliaSonera AB, had paid $320 million to Takilant (a Gibraltar-based shell company reportedly linked to Karimova) in exchange for licenses and frequencies in Uzbekistan.

In January 2013, Swedish investigators released new documents apparently showing that TeliaSonera had tried to negotiate directly with Karimova. In the same year, U.S. and Dutch authorities began investigating Karimova.

In February 2014, the chief executive of TeliaSonera was forced to resign after serious failures of due diligence were uncovered. In May, the Swedish media made documents public that suggested Karimova had aggressively dictated the terms of the TeliaSonera contract and threatened it with obstructions. Related money-laundering investigations in Switzerland and Sweden continued throughout the year, and hundreds of millions of dollars in accounts connected to the case being frozen by authorities.

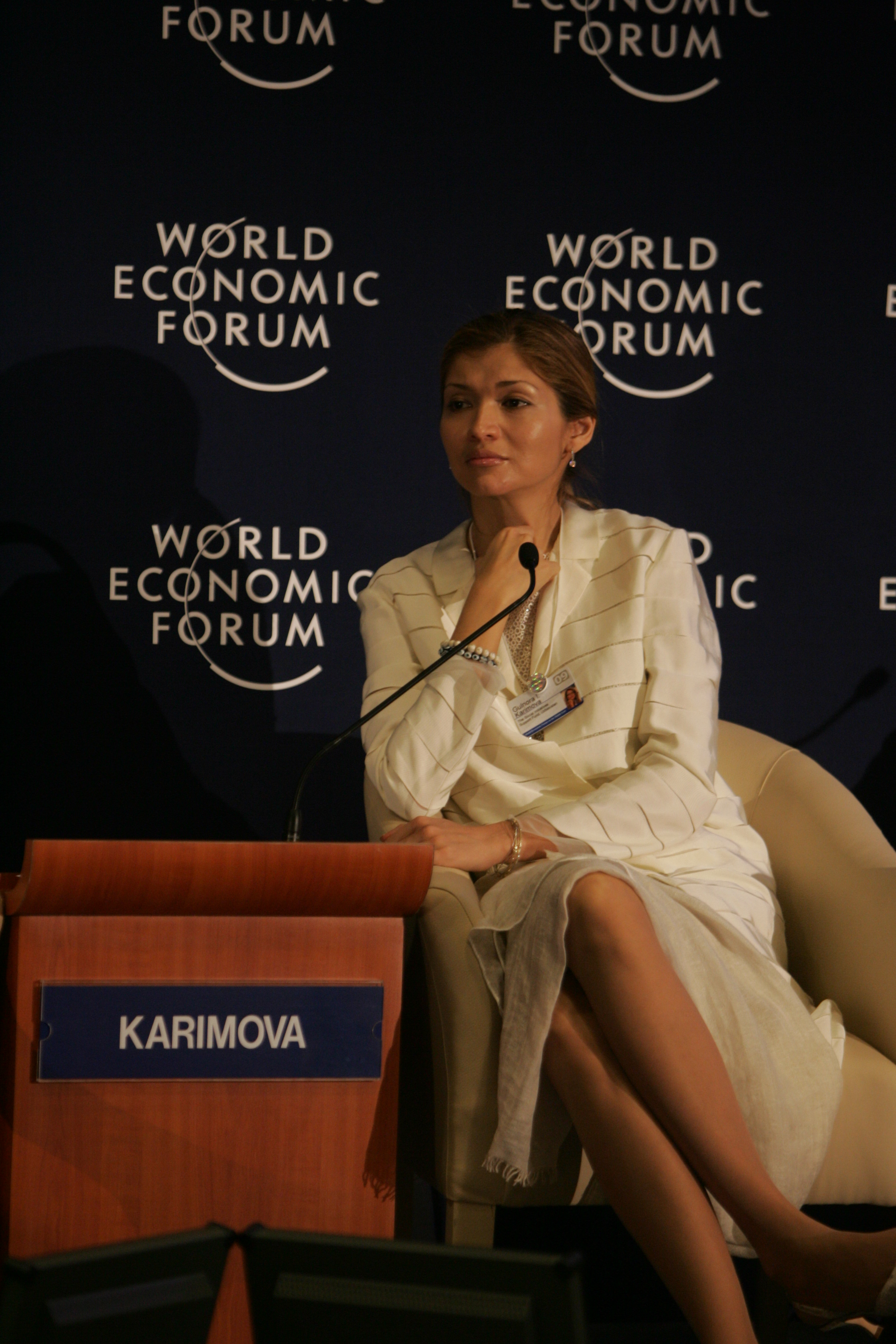
Gulnara Karimova

In March 2014, Swiss authorities began a money-laundering investigation into Karimova, and prosecutors in Bern said that the evidence had led their investigation into Sweden and France and that they had "seized assets in excess of 800 million Swiss francs ($912 million)." According to Swiss newspaper Le Temps, of the seized funds 500 million francs of the seized funds involved TeliaSonera and the remained "involved Karimova's personal assets."

In 2014, the United States Department of Justice (DOJ) and the Securities and Exchange Commission (SEC) investigated TeliaSonera as well as the Amsterdam-based Vimpelcom Ltd. and the Russian firm Mobile TeleSystems PJSC (MTS) on suspicion that these three firms had funneled hundreds of millions of dollars to firms controlled by Karimova. An August 2015 report stated that U.S. prosecutors were asking authorities in Ireland, Belgium, Luxembourg, Sweden, and Switzerland to seize assets of about $1 billion in connection with their investigation. Radio Free Europe/Radio Liberty reported in January 2015 that executives at the Norwegian telecom firm Telenor, which owns one-third of Vimpelcom, had knowledge about millions in bribes.

In March 2015, DOJ asked Sweden to freeze $30 million in funds held by the Stockholm-based Nordea Bank. The DOJ probe discovered that firms had "paid bribes to Uzbek officials to obtain mobile telecommunications business in Uzbekistan." European investigators revealed that Takilant was run by a former Karimova aide.

A July 2015 report stated that U.S. authorities were seeking to seize $300 million in bank accounts in Ireland, Luxembourg and Belgium, alleging that the funds were bribes paid to Karimova.

In August 2015, Radio Free Europe/Radio Liberty reported that Uzbek authorities had arrested nine suspects in connection with probes, including two top executives at a Coca-Cola bottling plant in Uzbekistan, which Karimova formerly owned.

=== Corruption in elections ===
"There are no free elections in Uzbekistan," according to Freedom House. In the April 2015 election, Karimov received 90.39% of the vote, winning a fourth term, although the constitution restricts presidents to two terms. Election observers from the Organization for Security and Co-operation in Europe were critical of the conduct of the election, and Steve Swerdlow of Human Rights Watch called it a "sham."

=== Judiciary ===
Corruption is widespread in Uzbekistan's judiciary. The judiciary system is officially independent, but corruption is rampant, and the law actually allows certain kinds of government interference and "equivocation." Public officials, lawyers, and judges often "interpret local legislation inconsistently and in conflict with each other." Corruption is a standard feature of legal proceedings, mainly in conflicts between firms. Judges are said to take bribes and kickbacks from individuals and companies in exchange for favorable verdicts. The judiciary is under the control of the executive, is riddled with nepotism, favoritism, and kickbacks, and is characterized by "unreliable and non-transparent" appeals processes. "Bribery, abuse of office and vague interpretation of laws" result in unfair decisions. In commercial cases, courts reportedly favor local companies over foreign firms. Courts are also alleged to address corruption charges against high-level officials only on presidential orders. Although the judicial system is required to uphold "investor rights and the sanctity of contracts," in practice it is said to regularly favor "state-owned or government-affiliated entities."

Court procedures in Uzbekistan, The Heritage Foundation says, "fall short of international standards, and powerful figures can expropriate property with impunity". In addition, private property can be confiscated by the government for no reason, with no system for registering liens on chattel in place.

=== Criminal justice system ===
According to Amnesty International, corruption is ingrained in Uzbekistan's justice system. Torture (in the form of "beatings, asphyxiation, rape and sexual assault") is widely used by law enforcement and the authorities. Torture is used to "extract confessions, to intimidate entire families or to extract bribes." Family members are tortured to extract confessions and "on the basis of these confessions, [torture survivors] have been sentenced to long terms in prison after unfair trials."

The Uzbekistani National Security Service has been reported to have engaged in torture.

=== Police ===
Corruption within the Uzbek police force has been described as "pervasive." Extortion is common, and police regularly use false charges to dissuade anyone from reporting their corruption crimes to higher bureaus. A 2014 report stated that police corruption had risen recently owing to the currency exchange market coming under the control of known criminal groups.

=== Public services ===
Corruption is common in the public services sector. Civil servants are low-paid and thus included to solicit and extort bribes, according to the Business Anti-Corruption Portal. Officials extort payments from companies in connection with the granting of permits and licenses, and "use arbitrary inspections and punitive sanctions to harass companies, to interfere with their business operations and to reduce market competition."

=== Land administration ===
Judicial corruption prevents the protection or enforcement of property rights. The Business Anti-Corruption Portal reports that the state routinely expropriates private property, providing opportunities for extortion and corruption.

=== Forced labor ===
While over 2-3 million Uzbeks (mostly university students as full-time workers for over 3 months, teachers, professors, doctors as a part-time for over 3 months) "were forced to work on cotton fields" during the 2014 harvest, according to the Organized Crime and Corruption Reporting Project (OCCRP), officials were alleged to have embezzled substantial funds from the operation. "Impossibly high quotas were reportedly set, with workers forced to pay fines to make up the deficits." The Uzbek-German Forum for Human Rights called the quotas an 'unprecedented degree of extortion', as workers were made to continue their labor in exchange for food and housing.

=== Tax administration ===
Corruption is said to be common in the Uzbek tax administration. The vague and ambiguous tax laws allow for official corruption, often in the form of bribery and extortion at the expense of foreign companies. Firms involved in judicial disputes are subject to the seizure of assets by tax officials, according to the Business Anti-Corruption Portal.

=== Customs administration ===
Uzbekistan's customs sector is riddled with corruption. Customs officials and border guards are reported to take bribes from smugglers, as a result of which the amount of smuggling increases annually.

Tashkent customs arrests

Several senior officials of the Tashkent Province State Customs Committee were arrested on bribery charges in October 2014. They were accused of extorting bribes, participating in organized crime, and eliciting favors in exchange for employment at the customs offices. The fees for clearing goods across borders are arbitrary, and foreign firms say that customs restrictions are "among the most severe challenges to doing business in Uzbekistan."

=== Public procurement ===
Corruption is ubiquitous in the public procurement sector, which is characterized by widespread conflicts of interest, a lack of transparency, and bribes being extorted in exchange for government contracts. There is a reported lack of transparency during the bidding for contracts from the government.

== Foreign investment ==
According to anti-corruption groups, most of the foreign firms that are awarded profitable contracts have ties to Uzbekistan's ruling elite. Foreign firms, explains one source, "regularly experience expropriations, politically motivated inspections and discrimination by authorities" in Uzbekistan. According to the U.S. Department of State, foreign firms “have reported numerous procedural infractions in both the Economic and Criminal courts of Uzbekistan and the Embassy knows of a number of cases in which foreign companies did not receive timely payments from local partners." In the World Bank's 2013 Doing Business Report, Uzbekistan stood at 149th out of 189 countries on the "Ease of Doing Business" scale.

U.S. firms say that corruption is the prime obstruction to foreign direct investment in Uzbekistan. These firms cite a "lack of transparency in bureaucratic processes, including procurement tenders and auctions, and limited access to currency convertibility, stimulate rent-seeking, which public sector employees often justify by pointing out their low wages."

To secure professional appointments, win government contracts, obtain exemptions from rules, escape criminal prosecution, receive public services, and earn preferences, bribery is a necessity, according to the U.S. Department of State. Many incidents of bribe solicitation have been reported to the U.S. Embassy, and "foreign investors who refuse to pay bribes have had difficulty in their business operations as a direct result." Time magazine reports that tenders and government jobs are easily attained through bribery, causing unqualified people to rise up in positions.

The State Department cites several complaints from investors who state the bidding process lacks transparency. "In some cases, the bidders have been foreign-registered companies associated with influential Uzbek families who have tenuous foreign addresses." Also, the Uzbek state can cancel any business's registration or license or impose punitive sanctions at will. Ministries have the power to decide whether companies under their jurisdiction require licenses. The Economic Court can shutter businesses, which have the right of appeal, although the process is slow, unpredictable, and non-transparent. More profitable foreign firms are at a greater risk of expropriation, although smaller and less profitable firms are still at risk. Expropriations have occurred in several industries including food processing, mining, retail, and telecommunications.

For eighteen months beginning in October 2011, the government prevented the production and distribution operations at a brewery owned by the Danish Carlsberg Group. In the same year, the government initiated the liquidation of the Amantaytau Goldfields, a joint venture involving a British firm, Oxus Gold.

In September 2012, the Tashkent City Criminal Court found Uzdunrobita, a cellular phone firm wholly owned by the Russian company MTS, guilty of financial crimes, and seized its assets. Two months later an appeals court reversed this verdict, but upheld the $600 million of fines imposed on the firm. MTS left the market, writing off all of its assets in Uzbekistan, which amounted to $1.1 billion. In 2013, the government transferred these assets to a government-owned telecom firm.

In 2013, government authorities began a criminal investigation into Muzimpex Company, the local partner of the Coca-Cola Company, which held a 43 percent stake in Muzimpex. In February 2014, the government liquidated Muzimpex and took it over.

In March 2025, Belgium transferred $108 million in seized assets to its state treasury, following an investigation into corruption linked to Uzbekistan. The assets were part of a larger probe into illicit payments related to telecom contracts in Uzbekistan, which resulted in the freezing of approximately $200 million. The investigation, which involved international legal cooperation, led to a ruling by a Brussels court that the funds should be confiscated and split between Belgium and Uzbekistan. In 2022, Uzbekistan’s Deputy Minister of Justice revealed that $240 million in assets linked to a criminal group associated with Gulnara Karimova had been located in Belgium, with efforts underway to return them to Uzbekistan.

== Civil society ==
The Uzbek Constitution's guarantee of press freedom is effectively non-existent in practice, with almost all media operating under government control. Journalists who criticize the regime are reported to have been subject to "physical violence, prosecution, detention and fines," often on charges of defamation. Journalists who investigate corruption are supposedly compelled to self-censor to avoid trouble. Local civil service organizations are prohibited from monitoring or reporting on corruption.

== Anti-corruption ==
The nation's criminal code forbids "all major forms of corruption" but the Business Anti-Corruption Portal reports that this law is poorly enforced. High-ranking government officials are said to act with impunity. The presidential family itself is involved in several investigations internationally. Persons who report corruption are reportedly not protected from retaliation.

Uzbekistan is a signatory of the United Nations Convention Against Corruption (UNCAC) and the Istanbul Action Plan, but not the OECD Convention on Combating Bribery of Foreign Public Officials in International Business Transactions. The government has been accused of neglecting any regional or local initiatives to seriously combat corruption.

To date, no international or local organizations have been granted permission to monitor or analyze corruption in Uzbekistan besides the General Prosecutor's Office, which is under the control of the Uzbek ruling regime. A number of officials are prosecuted every year under anti-corruption laws, with punishment varying "from a fine to imprisonment with confiscation of property." The defendants tend to be political dissenters, rather than any of the corrupt officials with ties to the ruling elite.

The Anti-Corruption Agency was established in accordance with the Decree of the President of the Republic of Uzbekistan ‘On additional measures to improve the anti-corruption system in the Republic of Uzbekistan’ of June 29, 2020. Following its establishment, Akmal Burkhanov was appointed as the acting director.

== International tolerance of Uzbek corruption ==
Owing largely to its strategic location and its natural gas supplies, many countries have been loath to pressure Uzbekistan to improve its corruption record. For example, despite his nation's high levels of corruption and human rights violations, Karimov received a warm welcome from the President of the European Commission. Germany has been described as ignoring much of the Uzbek regime's corruption and violations, defying EU sanctions imposed in 2005 after the Andijan massacre in which anywhere from 200 to 1,500 people were killed, training Uzbek officers, and making annual payments to the Uzbek government in exchange for access to a military facility in Termiz. Der Spiegel suggested that the German government may foresee its relations with Uzbekistan as a means of profiting from planned natural gas pipelines under consideration of construction.
