= Chattel mortgage =

Legal term for a type of loan contract

Chattel mortgage (sometimes abbreviated CM) is the legal term for a type of loan contract used in some states with legal systems derived from English law.

Under a typical chattel mortgage, the purchaser borrows funds for the purchase of movable personal property (the chattel) from the lender. The lender then secures the loan with a mortgage over the chattel. Legal ownership of the chattel is transferred to the purchaser at the time of purchase, and the mortgage is removed once the loan has been repaid.

Chattel mortgages may have more particular characteristics in different jurisdictions.

== Australia ==
In Australia, chattel mortgages are commonly used by companies, partnerships and sole traders to fund the purchase of cars, commercial vehicles and other business equipment.

Under Australian Taxation Office rules, businesses that account for GST on a cash basis are entitled to claim an Input Tax Credit for all of the GST contained in the purchase price of the chattel on their next Business Activity Statement.

Repayment of chattel mortgages in most Australian states attract stamp duty.

== England and Wales ==
Chattel mortgages in England and Wales are seen as a form of security interest (or "collateral") for lenders in certain financing scenarios. Individuals (broadly, non-incorporated legal persons) may give a chattel mortgage over their personal property; however, it must be in the statutory form prescribed by the Bills of Sale Act 1878 and the Bills of Sale Act (1878) Amendment Act 1882 for it to constitute valid security.

Companies and other corporate entities may also give chattel mortgages over any tangible, movable property as security for a debt obligation. This type of security will usually fall under the category of registrable charges under the Companies Act 2006.

For a chattel mortgage to be a legal mortgage, it must transfer legal title to the chattel (or chattels) to the secured party (typically the lender) and include an express or implied proviso that the legal title will be transferred back to the debtor upon repayment (known as the equity of redemption). (If the chattel mortgage does not meet the statutory requirements for a legal mortgage it may nevertheless be re-characterised as an equitable mortgage or fixed or floating charge.)

Chattel mortgages over certain assets (such as ships and aircraft) are governed by more particular rules.

== United States ==
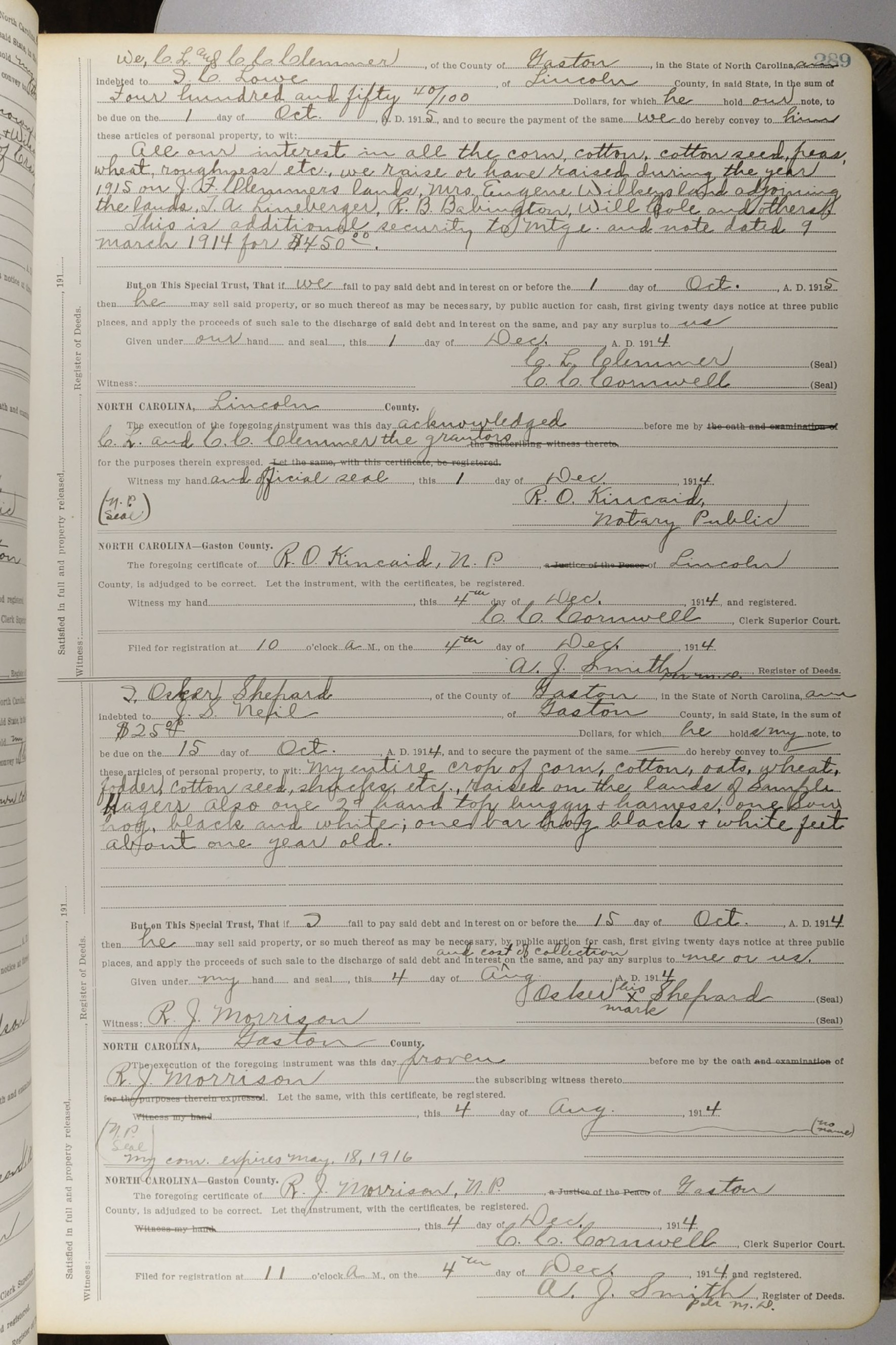
A chattel mortgage from 1914 to 1915, in Gaston County, North Carolina

In the United States, chattel mortgages are referred to as secured transactions. Article 9 of the Uniform Commercial Code governs such transactions in most states.

However, later, some of the first laws on chattel mortgages in the Anglo-American world were passed. These early laws differed from other early laws in that filings and witnesses were required to enforce the security interest to prevent the debtor from fraudulently using the pledged collateral as a security interest in another loan. The issue had been handled differently in Roman law, by allowing the lender to sue a fraudulent debtor, and in Napoleonic law, by banning the transactions.

== See also ==
- Hire purchase
- Leasing
- Closed-end leasing
- Installment plan
