= Hire purchase =

Form of arrangement

A hire purchase (HP), also known as an installment plan, is an arrangement whereby a customer agrees to a contract to acquire an asset by paying an initial installment (e.g., 40% of the total) and repaying the balance of the price of the asset plus interest over a period of time. Other analogous practices are described as closed-end leasing or rent-to-own.

The hire purchase agreement was developed in the United Kingdom in the 19th century to allow customers with a cash shortage to make an expensive purchase they otherwise would have to delay or forgo. For example, in cases where a buyer cannot afford to pay the asked price for an item of property as a lump sum but can afford to pay a percentage as a deposit, a hire-purchase contract allows the buyer to hire the goods for a monthly rent. When a sum equal to the original full price plus interest has been paid in equal installments, the buyer may then exercise an option to buy the goods at a predetermined price (usually a nominal sum) or return the goods to the owner.

If the buyer defaults in paying the installments, the owner may repossess the goods, a vendor protection not available with unsecured-consumer-credit systems. HP is frequently advantageous to consumers because it spreads the cost of expensive items over an extended time period. Business consumers may find the different balance sheet and taxation treatment of hire-purchased goods beneficial to their taxable income. The need for HP is reduced when consumers have collateral or other forms of credit readily available, such as credit cards.

These contracts are most commonly used for items such as automobiles and high-value electrical goods where the purchasers are unable to pay for the goods directly.

== Standard provisions ==
To be valid, HP agreements must be in writing and signed by both parties. They must clearly lay out the following information in a print that all can read without effort:

1. a clear description of the goods
2. the cash price for the goods
3. the HP price (i.e., the total sum that must be paid to hire and then purchase the goods)
4. the deposit
5. the monthly installments (most states require that the applicable interest rate is disclosed and regulate the rates and charges that can be applied in HP transactions)
6. a reasonably comprehensive statement of the parties' rights (sometimes including the right to cancel the agreement during a "cooling-off" period)
7. The right of the hirer to terminate the contract when he feels like doing so with a valid reason

== The seller and the owner ==
If the seller has the resources and the legal right to sell the goods on credit (which usually depends on a licensing system in most countries), the seller and the owner will be the same person. But most sellers prefer to receive a cash payment immediately. To achieve this, the seller transfers ownership of the goods to a Finance Company, usually at a discounted price, and it is this company that hires and sells the goods to the buyer. This introduction of a third party complicates the transaction. Suppose that the seller makes false claims as to the quality and reliability of the goods that induce the buyer to "buy". In a conventional contract of sale, the seller will be liable to the buyer if these representations prove false. But in this instance, the seller who makes the representation is not the owner who sells the goods to the buyer only after all the installments have been paid. To combat this, some jurisdictions, including Ireland, make the seller and the finance house jointly and severally liable to answer for breaches of the purchase contract.

=== Implied warranties and conditions to protect the hirer ===
The extent to which buyers are protected varies from jurisdiction to jurisdiction, but the following are usually present:

1. the hirer will be allowed to enjoy quiet possession of the goods, i.e. no-one will interfere with the hirer's possession during the term of this contract
2. the owner will be able to pass title to, or ownership of, the goods when the contract requires it
3. that the goods are of merchantable quality and fit for their purpose, save that exclusion clauses may, to a greater or lesser extent, limit the Finance Company's liability
4. where the goods are let by reference to a description or to a sample, what is actually supplied must correspond with the description and the sample.

== The hirer's rights ==
The hirer usually has the following rights:

1. To buy the goods at any time by giving notice to the owner and paying the balance of the HP price less a rebate
2. To return the goods to the owner
3. With the consent of the owner, to assign both the benefit and the burden of the contract to a third person. The owner cannot unreasonably refuse consent where the nominated third party has good credit rating.
4. Where the owner wrongfully repossesses the goods, either to recover the goods plus damages for loss of quiet possession or to damages representing the value of the goods lost.

Each jurisdiction has a different formula for calculating the amount of the rebate. Generally, returning the goods is subject to the payment of a penalty to reflect the owner's loss of profit but subject to a maximum specified in each jurisdiction's law to strike a balance between the need for the buyer to minimize liability and the fact that the owner now has possession of an obsolescent asset of reduced value.

== The hirer's obligations ==
The hirer usually has the following obligations:

1. to pay the hire installment
2. to take reasonable care of the goods (if the hirer damages the goods by using them in a non-standard way, they must continue to pay the installments and if appropriate, recompense the owner for any loss in asset value)
3. to inform the owner where the goods will be kept.
4. A hirer can sell the products if, and only if, they have purchased the goods finally or else not to any other third party.

== The owner's rights ==
The owner usually has the right to terminate the agreement where the hirer defaults in paying the installments or breaches any of the other terms in the agreement. This entitles the owner:

1. to forfeit the deposit
2. to retain the installments already paid and recover the balance due
3. to repossess the goods (which may have to be by application to a Court depending on the nature of the goods and the percentage of the total price paid)
4. to claim damages for any loss suffered

== In Australia ==
Hire purchases are commonly used by businesses (including companies, partnerships and sole traders) in Australia to fund the purchase of cars, commercial vehicles and other business equipment.

Under Australian Taxation Office rules, businesses who account for GST on an accruals basis are entitled to claim an Input Tax Credit for all of the GST contained in the purchase price of the goods on their next Business Activity Statement.

Hire purchase is also commonly known as commercial hire purchase and corporate hire purchase (both abbreviated to CHP) in Australia. Hire Purchase was brought to Australia in the early 1960s by Les Meteyard and his business partner (currently unknown).

== In Malaysia ==
Hire purchases agreement are commonly known as H.P agreement in Malaysia and it is used by financial institutions in Malaysia to fund the purchase of consumer goods, vehicles and other business equipment and industrial machinery.

In Malaysia, the legislation governing hire purchase transactions is the Hire Purchase Act 1967, which came into force on 11 April 1968 after hire purchase became popular in the acquisition of expensive consumer goods such as cars, business equipment and industrial machinery. Purchasing cars is the most common type of hire purchase agreement in Malaysia and the repayment could take up to 9 years from the date of agreement been executed.

== See also ==
- Buy now, pay later
- Chattel mortgage
- Closed-end leasing
- Installment loan
- Layaway
- Leasing
- Personal contract purchase
- Rent-to-own
- Vehicle leasing
