= Mark Speese =

American businessman

Mark E. Speese (born 1957) is an American businessman who founded Plano, Texas-based rent-to-own company Rent-A-Center in 1986, growing the company to almost 3,000 company-owned stores in the United States and Mexico. Speese served as the company's CEO from 2001 to 2014 and again from 2017 to 2018.

== Career ==
Speese began his career in the rent-to-own industry with the Rent-A-Center brand in January 1978. After nearly 8 years, he and two colleague left the company to start a competing business known as Vista Rent-To-Own. They opened stores in New Jersey, Puerto Rico, and California. Speese was responsible for choosing store locations, negotiating leases, hiring and training personnel, writing the business model and employee handbook, creating advertising, and getting vendors in place.

Beginning in 1990, Speese served as president and COO. Vista Rent-To-Own made its first acquisitions in 1993 and changed its name to Renter's Choice. The company went public on the NASDAQ market in 1995 under the symbol RCII. By 1998, Renter's Choice had grown to be the second largest rent-to-own company in the industry, with 750 stores. Renter's Choice acquired 1,409 Rent-A-Center stores from Thorn Americas, Renter's Choice adopted the Rent-A-Center name and consolidated operations in Plano. Speese became vice chairman.

In 2001, Speese became the company's CEO and board chairman. He retired from the position in 2014, but continued to serve as the company's chairman of the board.

Speese returned to the CEO on an interim basis in January 2017 after an executive shake up led to the resignation of CEO Robert Davis. The board removed Speese' interim title in April. Speese resigned as CEO in January 2018.

== Compensation ==
According to Forbes, in 2011, Speese's annual compensation was as follows: Salary: $865,700; Option awards: $84,900; Non-equity incentive plan compensation: $1,099,326; All other compensation: $10,028. Total overall compensation of $2,059,954.

== Affiliations ==
- Collin County Children's Advocacy Center in Plano, Texas, President of the Board
- Dallas Regional Chamber of Commerce, board of directors
- Dallas Citizen's Council, member
- Collin County Business Alliance, board of directors

== Honors and awards ==
- Ernst & Young Entrepreneur of the Year for Retailing, 2005
- Plano Chamber of Commerce's Business Executive of the Year Award, 2006
- philanthropic Award from Collin County Children's Advocacy Center's 14th Annual Appreciation Luncheon, 2008
- 1 for the 21st Century Leadership Award from Inside Collin County Business, 2008
- Bank of America Local Hero's Award recipient, 2009
- University of North Texas Murphy Award for Lifetime Achievement in Entrepreneurship, 2009
- Association of Progressive Rental Organizations’ (APRO) Ernie Talley Lifetime Achievement Award, 2011
