= Canada Drives =

Canadian online vehicle retailer

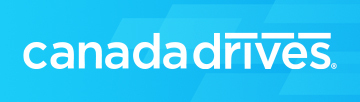
- Type: Private
- Industry: E-commerce / automotive
- Founded: 2010
- Founder: Cody Green
- Headquarters: Vancouver, British Columbia, Canada
- Area served: Canada
- Key people: Cody Green (Co-CEO); Michael Galpin (Co-CEO); Stephen Brown (CFO)
- Services: Online Vehicle Retailing & Auto Financing
- Number of employees: 700+ (February 2022)
- Website: www.canadadrives.ca

Canada Drives is a Canadian online vehicle retailer founded in 2010 and based in Vancouver. The company allows customers to buy certified used cars online. Customers can also sell their vehicle to Canada Drives or trade it in.

== History ==
Cody Green founded Canada Drives in 2010. While working at a dealership, he noticed flaws in the existing sales process when customers would choose a vehicle only to then be declined for finance. To make the process more efficient, he started helping customers get approved for car finance before choosing a vehicle. Realizing the scale of this customer pain point, he set out to solve the problem by building an online platform around this inverted process. Green has stated that Canada Drives’ mission is “to be the easiest place to buy or sell your car in Canada.”

Co-CEO Michael Galpin joined the company in 2011. In 2014, Canada Drives moved from Saskatoon to Vancouver to be closer to the growing tech sector there. At the time, Canada Drives had six employees. It founded Spring Financial in the same year. As of February 2022, the company employed more than 700 people.

Canada Drives was identified as a company growing fast enough for an IPO but opted to stay private due to low-interest private equity funds. In 2019, U.S.-based growth equity firm Anthos Capital invested $100 million.

Canada Drives expanded its business model in 2020 from online auto financing to online vehicle retailing and delivery. The company currently operates in Ontario, Alberta, British Columbia, and Saskatchewan.

Sukhinder Singh Cassidy joined the Canada Drives board of directors in 2021 while the company closed $100 million CAD in a Series B round of funding led by San Francisco-based Honor Ventures. In 2022 financial services company goeasy Ltd. made a $40 million minority equity investment.

Canada Drives is an official partner of the Canadian Football League (CFL).

On March 21, 2023, Canada Drives announced a plan to restructure its business operations and ends online vehicle retailing and delivery. As a part of its restructuring process, It filed for and was granted creditor protection under the Companies’ Creditors Arrangement Act, pursuant to an initial order (the “Initial Order”) of the Supreme Court of British Columbia. It let go 95% of its IT staff and returned to its old online auto financing.

== Recognition ==
In 2016, Canada Drives earned the top spot on the Canadian Business Profit 500 list with 5-year revenue growth of 12,686% and was named Canada's Fastest-Growing Company. From 2016 to 2021 the company was ranked numbers 44, 104, 193, 321, 386 and 479 respectively on the Deloitte Technology Fast 500 list of fastest growing digital technology, media, and entertainment companies. In 2019 and 2020, Deloitte recognized Canada Drives as one of Canada's Best Managed Companies. In 2021, the company was named one of Deloitte's Enterprise Fast 15 winners for a third time.

Founder Cody Green has been included on Canada's Top 40 Under 40 2017 list of up-and-coming leaders by BNN Bloomberg as well as the Business in Vancouver Forty Under 40 honoree list. In 2016, Green was a recipient of the Ernst & Young Entrepreneur of the Year Award.
