= Rent-A-Center =

American furniture and electronics rent-to-own company

Rent-A-Center, Inc.
- Type: Public
- Traded as: Nasdaq: UPBD; S&P 600 component
- Industry: Home furnishings Rent-to-own
- Founded: 1973; 53 years ago 1986 (incorporated); Wichita, Kansas, US
- Headquarters: Plano, Texas, US
- Key people: Mitchell Fadel (CEO); Fahmi Karam (CFO)
- Products: Provides furniture, electronics, computers and household appliances available under rent-to-own agreements
- Revenue: ▲US$4.16 billion (2024)
- Operating income: ▲US$193 million (2019)
- Net income: ▲US$125 million (2019)
- Total assets: ▲US$2.62 billion (2024)
- Total equity: ▲US$459 million (2019)
- Number of employees: 14,500 (2020)
- Parent: Upbound Group, Inc
- Subsidiaries: Rent-A-Center Franchising International
- Website: rentacenter.com

Rent-A-Center is an American public furniture and electronics rent-to-own company based in Plano, Texas. The company was incorporated in 1986 and as of 2014 operates approximately 2,972 company-owned stores in the United States, Puerto Rico and Mexico, accounting for approximately 35% of the rent-to-own market in the United States based on store count.

Rent-A-Center's operations include 24 retail installment stores called Get It Now (based in Wisconsin); 17 Home Choice stores in Minnesota. Its subsidiary, Rent-A-Center Franchising International Inc. (RACFI), formerly known as ColorTyme Inc., is America's first franchisor of independently owned-and-operated rent-to-own stores. Its franchisees operate 162 rent-to-own stores in 31 states under the Rent-A-Center and ColorTyme brand names, and the company's wheels-and-tires franchise brand, RimTyme, operates 31 stores in 13 states.

In 2014, Fortune Magazine listed Rent-A-Center at number 711 on the Fortune 1000 list of the largest US corporations, based on revenues alone.

== History ==
The rent-to-own business was started by Ernie Talley in Wichita, Kansas during the 1960s when he told customers of his store, Mr. T's Rental, that they had rented a washer and dryer for a long enough duration that they had paid for it in full and now owned it. Thomas Devlin, a former employee of Mr. T's rental, recognized the potential of renting name-brand products and partnered with W. Frank Barton and founded the Rent-A-Center brand in Wichita, Kansas in 1973.

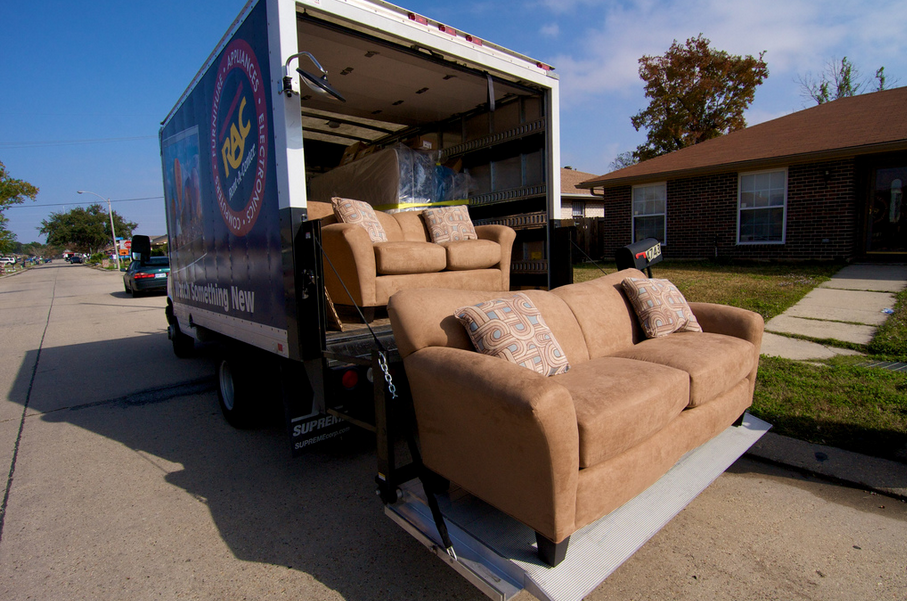
Truck delivering Rent-A-Center items

Mark Speese joined Rent-A-Center in 1979. In 1986, Mr. Speese and a colleague left Rent-A-Center and started a competing business known as Vista Rent-To-Own. Ernest Talley then joined Vista Rent-To-Own as chairman of the board of directors in 1989 and remained Chairman through Vista's transition to Rent-A-Center. In 1987, Thorn EMI acquired Rent-A-Center for $594 million.

Vista Rent-To-Own changed its name to Renters Choice, Inc. in December 1993, in connection with the acquisition from DEF Investments, Inc. and certain related entities of an 84 store rent-to-own chain operating in 12 states.

Renters Choice went public on the NASDAQ stock exchange in 1995 under the symbol "RCII". In August 1998, Renters Choice acquired Thorn Americas, Inc., which operated 1,474 stores in 49 states and the District of Columbia under the name "Rent-A-Center". On December 31, 1998, Renters Choice changed its name to Rent-A-Center, Inc. and began operating all of its stores under the "Rent-A-Center" brand name.

In 2001, Talley retired and Speese was appointed as Rent-A-Center's Chairman and CEO. In February 2003, Rent-A-Center acquired 295 stores from Rent-Way, Inc. In March 2004, Rent-A-Center commenced operating in Canada with the acquisition of five stores located in Edmonton and Calgary, Alberta. In May 2004, Rent-A-Center completed the acquisitions of Rainbow Rentals, Inc. and Rent Rite, Inc. Rent-A-Center completed its acquisition of competitor Rent-Way, Inc. on November 15, 2006, for a price of approximately $600.3 million. At the time of the acquisition, Rent-Way was ranked number three in the rent-to-own industry with 782 stores in 34 states. The Rent-Way store acquisition program brought the store total to 3,535 stores. Given that the acquisition resulted in over-penetration in some markets, Rent-A-Center carried out the closing or merging of 282 stores between 2007 and 2009. With 123 Mexico stores as of December 2019, Rent-A-Center is continuing its expansion in Mexico.

Launched in 2006, under the brand name RAC Acceptance, Rent-A-Center, Inc. operates lease-to-own kiosks within third-party retail locations across the country. The kiosks transitioned to the AcceptanceNOW brand in January 2014.

Mark Speese retired as Rent-A-Center CEO at the end of January 2014. Rent-A-Center CFO Robert Davis served as CEO from January 2014 to January 2017, when Mark Speese returned as interim CEO.

In January 2018, Mark Speese stepped down as CEO and was succeeded by former president Mitchell Fadel.

In August 2019, Rent-A-Center completed the acquisition of Merchants Preferred, a nationwide provider of virtual lease-to-own services. After acquiring Merchants Preferred, Rent-A-Center unveiled its integrated retail partner offering, Preferred Lease. Preferred Lease is the combined business model of AcceptanceNOW's staffed lease-to-own business with Merchants Preferred's virtual lease-to-own business.

On February 27, 2023, Rent-A-Center, Inc. changed their corporate name to Upbound Group, Inc. and consolidated several brands from their acquisition of Acima Holdings two years prior.

== Business operations ==
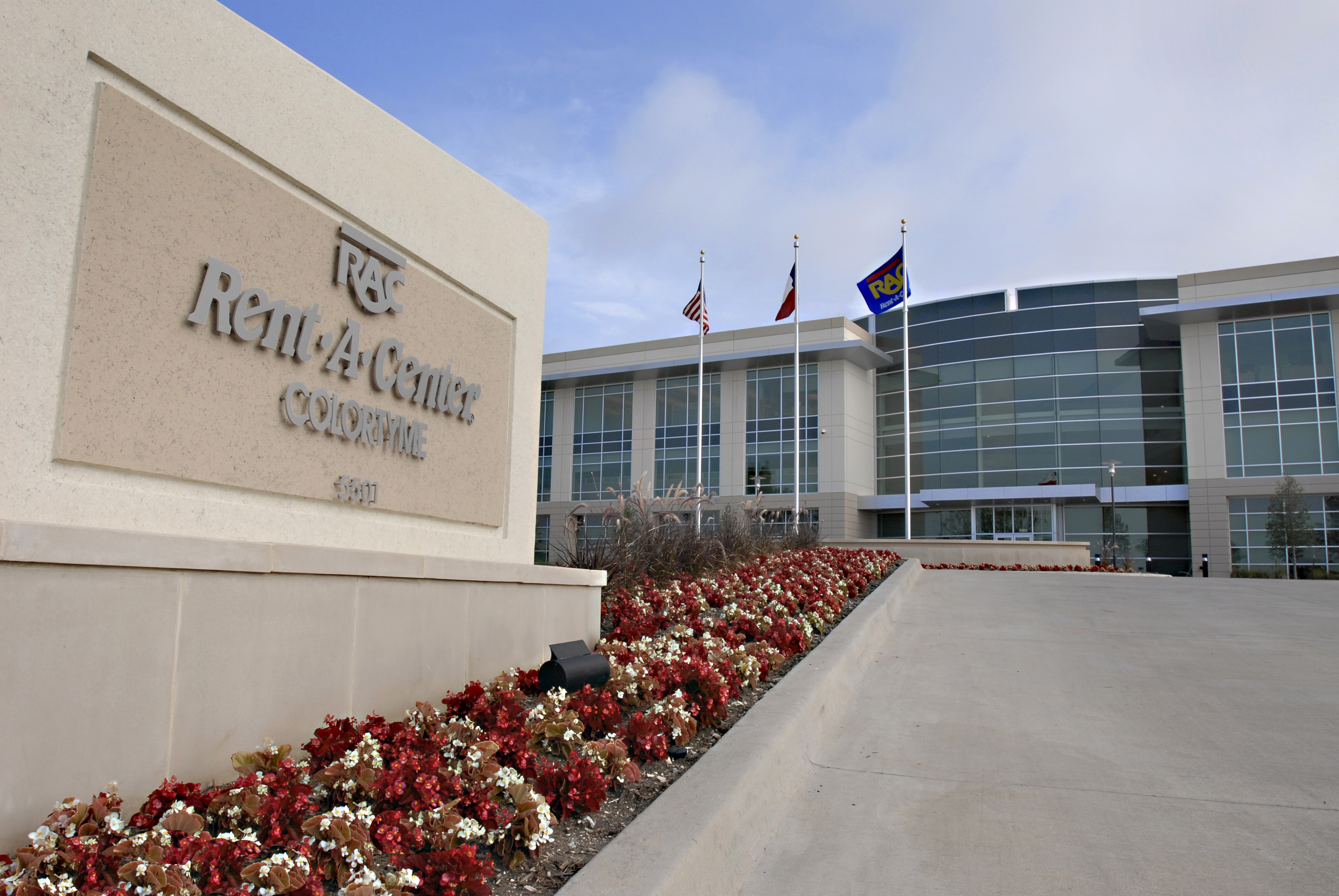
Rent-A-Center headquarters building, Plano, Texas.

RAC provides new and used brand-named furniture, appliances, computers and electronics from brands, such as Ashley Furniture, Sony, Whirlpool Corporation, Dell and HP. As part of their rent-to-own business model, Rent-A-Center generally makes its items available with small initial payments and no long term obligations. Customers can return an item at any time, for any reason, without penalty and also have the option to re-rent the same item and pick up the payments where they left off. Delivery, pickup, service and repair are also included in the stated rental price. Customers can also upgrade items while they are renting—the payments will change accordingly.

In March 2007, the corporate office moved to a new location at 5501 Headquarters Drive, Plano, Texas, in the Legacy Business Park. Construction began on the 175,000-square-foot (16,300 m^{2}) building in January 2006. Employees moved into the building on March 16, 2007. The current headquarters measures three stories and includes structured parking for 400 vehicles, a fitness center, game room and lunchroom. In January 2020, Cawley Partners announced the acquisition of the Rent-A-Center corporate office, leasing back 60 percent of the building to Rent-A-Center.

In July 2015, Rent A Center sold several Ontario Locations to EasyHome for $3.4 million. With this agreement, Rent A Center & EasyHome signed a 3-year agreement to a non-compete contract that each company cannot open any stores in each other's countries.

=== Philanthropy ===
Rent-A-Center supports charities that provide family and youth empowerment opportunities. Beginning in 2003, the company made donations to Big Brothers Big Sisters of America locations, collected by means of fundraisers held on an annual basis in Rent-A-Center stores. Between 2005 and 2010, Rent-A-Center donated and set up 116 "RAC Rooms" at Boys and Girls Clubs of America locations, in which each club selects $5,000 worth of new furniture, electronics and computers for their room.

Since 2003, Rent-A-Center has provided monetary and product contributions totaling nearly $1.2 million to date to the North Texas Food Bank. Employees in the Field Support Center have also volunteered over 1,000 hours to Dallas-area food banks during the annual North Texas Food Bank campaign. Rent-A-Center has also donated more than $1.25 million to 11 other food banks across the country since 2009. This is in addition to a hunger-relief campaign staged across Rent-A-Center's 3,000-plus US stores throughout the month of September. This effort supports Hunger Action Month. This virtual food drive leverages Rent-A-Center's stores as collection points for cash donations. The donated funds are distributed to food banks across the US and Puerto Rico at the conclusion of the month-long campaign.

== Reception and litigation ==
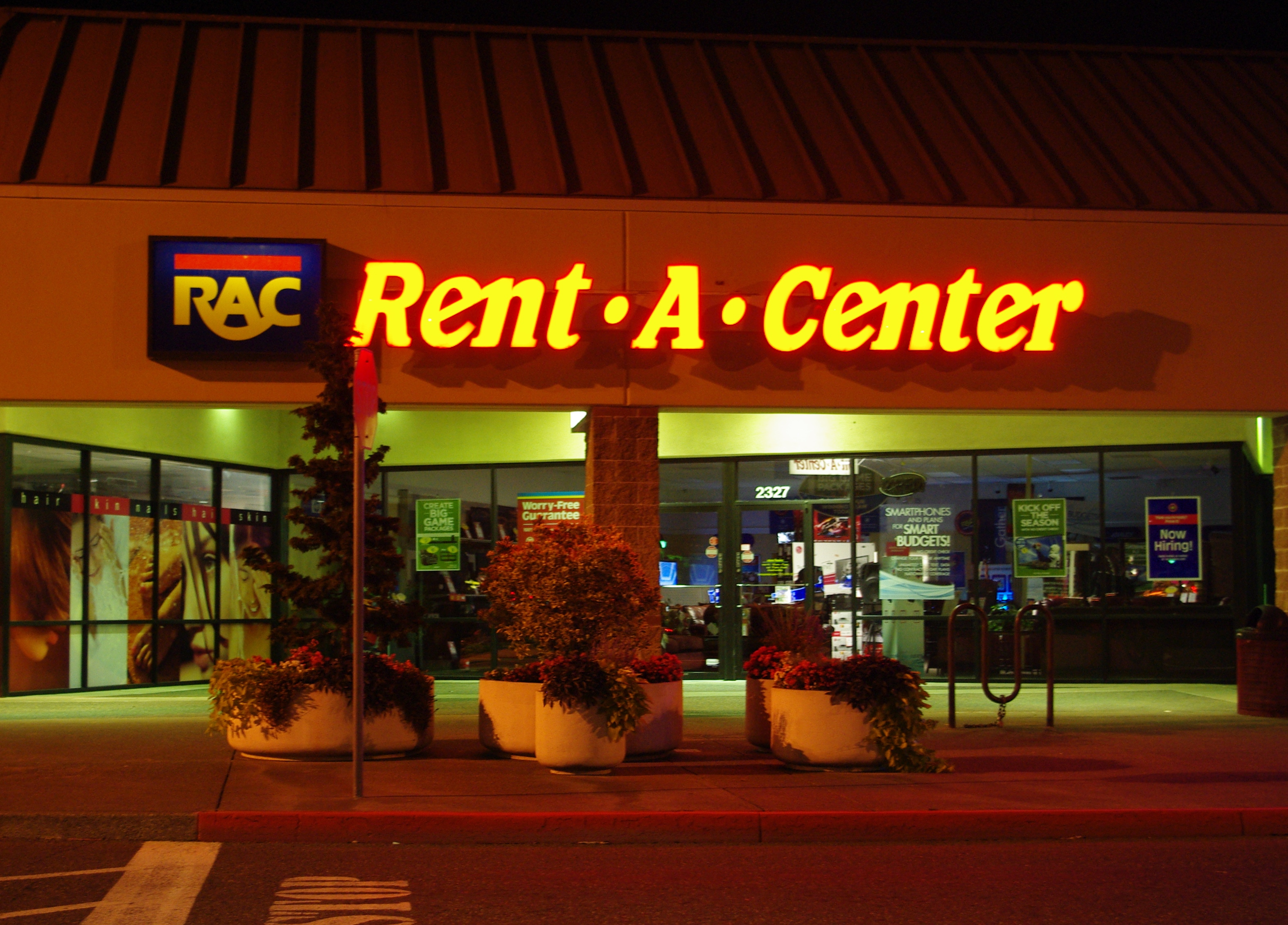
A store in Hillsboro, Oregon

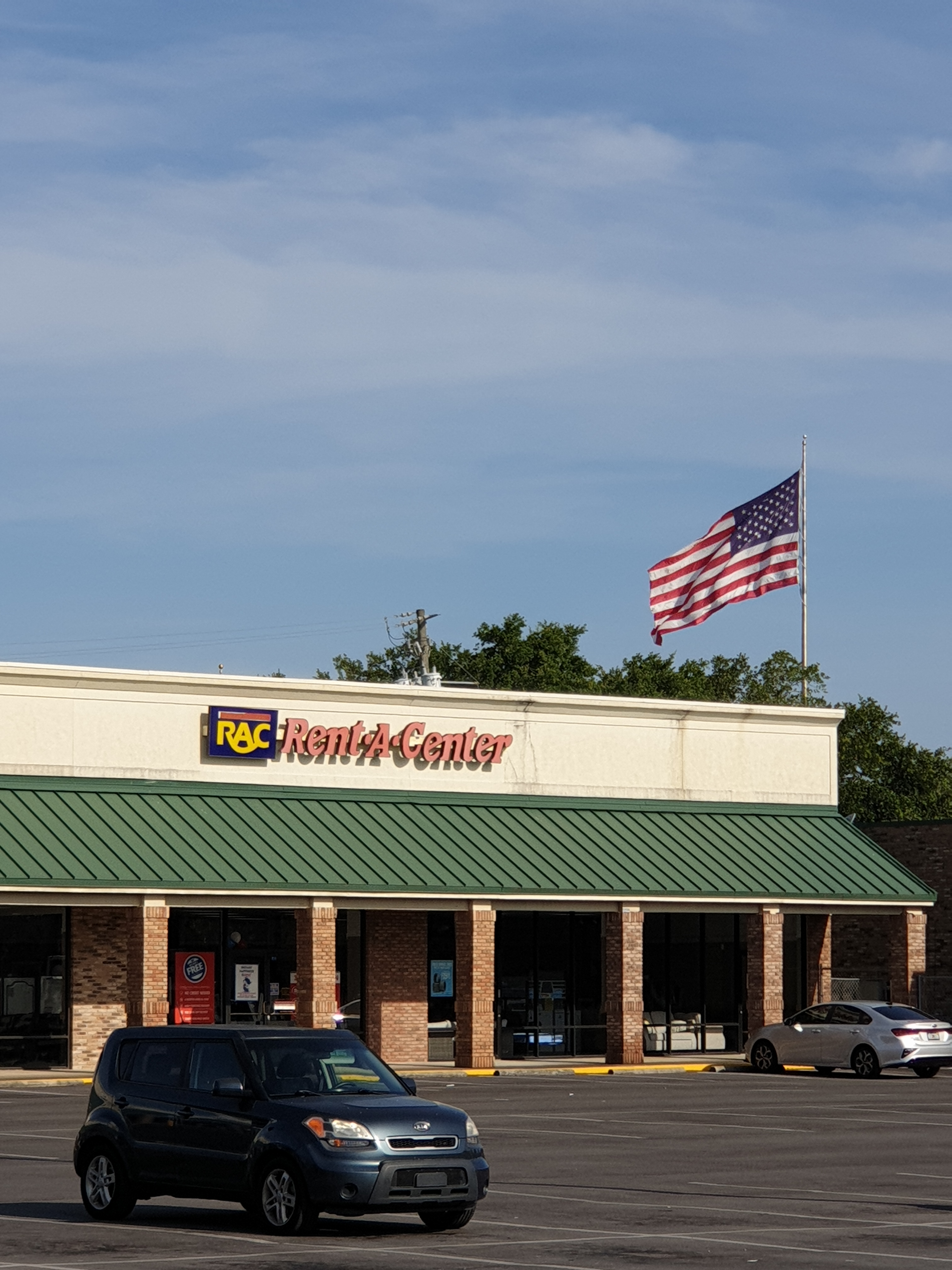
A store in Fort Walton Beach, Florida

A number of consumer protection concerns have been raised about the rent-to-own industry, including accusations of predatory lending. Consumer advocates believe that rent-to-own transactions such as those offered by Rent-A-Center should be treated as credit sales, and point out that the final price of a product can be two or three times the retail price. In an April 2000 Federal Trade Commission study on the industry, 75% of respondents stated that they were satisfied with their rent-to-own experience, whereas 19% were dissatisfied.

In 2000, Rent-A-Center was sued for sexual bias in the hiring of women. The 2002 settlement agreement resulted in a $47 million cash payment by Rent-A-Center and mandated that Rent-A-Center offer 10% of future vacancies over the following 15-month period to women who were found to be past victims of discrimination. The settlement also led Rent-A-Center to seek qualified women to serve on its board of directors, develop equal employment training programs, and hire a new human resources vice president to implement hiring policies that ensured equal employment opportunity for female job applicants and current employees.

In 2006, Rent-A-Center settled for $7 million in restitution and $750,000 in civil penalties for deceptive business practices in California. The State of California claimed RAC, in violation of state law, engaged in unfair competition and illegally misrepresented the price of certain merchandise. As a result of the settlement, RAC also deposited more than $7 million into a special consumer protection fund that is used to enforce consumer protection laws.

In 2010, seven months after the Washington Attorney General's Office sued Rent-A-Center and accused the national lease-to-own chain of unfair and deceptive collection practices under Washington's Consumer Protection Act, Rent-A-Center agreed to settle.

Another prominent case in 2010 was Rent-A-Center vs. Jackson which arose out of an employment discrimination claim brought on by former RAC employee Antonio Jackson. The case reached the Supreme Court, which sided with RAC in a 5–4 decision. The court held that if a company's arbitration agreement includes a clause delegating fairness challenges to the arbitrator, a court must enforce that agreement and send the matter to arbitration. When Jackson first sued, Rent-A-Center cited its arbitration agreement and claimed that any challenges to the agreement had to be decided by the arbitrator.

In 2020, Rent-A-Center settled a California class action suit for $13 million, with the suit involving a group of customers challenging improper add-on freight charges.

In November 2023, Rent-A-Center paid the state of Massachusetts $8.75 million to settle claims of unfair and deceptive business practices. RAC also agreed to stop filing criminal complaints against its customers for missed payments.

== Other names ==
The Rent-A-Center company converted its Wisconsin stores to Get-It-Now! credit sale outlets after a judicial decision held that the state's consumer protection laws defining credit sales included rent-to-own businesses. Rent-A-Center is also known as Acceptance Now or Preferred Lease within its partner stores in the US in which it has kiosks.

In Mexico, the company is simply known as RAC (sounded out like the word "rack"), and the company operates as Home Choice in Minnesota, also due to similar rent-to-own laws from those in Wisconsin.

== See also ==
- Closed-end leasing
