= Get It Now =

Get It Now may refer to:

- Get-It-Now!, a division of Rent-A-Center in Wisconsin, US
- "Get It Now", a 2007 song by Amanda Blank
