= GSY =

GSY may refer to:

- Glycogen synthase
- goeasy, a Canadian financial services company
- Guernsey, Chapman code
- Guiseley railway station, in Leeds, England
