= ColorTyme =

American rent-to-own store

- Industry: Home furnishings; Rent-to-own
- Headquarters: Plano, Texas
- Key people: Cathy Skula, President and CEO
- Website: colortyme.com

ColorTyme is a wholly owned subsidiary of Rent-A-Center. ColorTyme is owned and operated independently.

== Litigation ==
In 1994, the Minnesota Supreme Court ruled in Miller v. ColorTyme that the lease agreements offered by ColorTyme were covered under the state's Consumer Credit Sales Act, and that the lease agreements were therefore not leases but sales on credit. The court further held that the company was charging usurious rates of interest to its customers. A similar lawsuit, filed by the office of Wisconsin Attorney General James E. Doyle in 1993, resulted in the company being fined $25,000 and required to disclose interest rates and other credit terms to consumers. ColorTyme later settled a class action lawsuit brought by the Legal Aid Society of Milwaukee by agreeing to pay $2.9 million, including $675,000 in interest-free loans to low-income individuals and families.
