= Rent-to-own =

Type of transaction

Lease purchase agreement (click to view pages)

Rent-to-own, also known as rental purchase or rent-to-buy, is a type of legally documented transaction under which tangible property, such as furniture, consumer electronics, motor vehicles, home appliances, engagement rings, and real property, is leased in exchange for a weekly or monthly payment, with the option to purchase at some point during the agreement.

A rent-to-own transaction differs from a traditional lease, in that the lessee can purchase the leased item at any time during the agreement (in a traditional lease the lessee has no such right), and from a hire purchase or installment plan, in that the lessee can terminate the agreement by simply returning the property (in a hire purchase the buyer has a limited time, if any, to cancel the agreement).

The usage of rent-to-own transactions began in the United Kingdom and Europe, and first appeared in the United States during the 1950s and 1960s. While rent-to-own terminology is most commonly associated with consumer goods transactions, the term is sometimes used in connection with real estate transactions.

== Furniture, electronics, and appliances ==
=== History ===
The concept of the rent-to-own transactions first emerged in the United Kingdom and continental European countries under the hire purchase model. One of the first rent-to-own retail stores established in the U.K. was Lotus Radio, which began operating as a radio rental business in 1933. Within the United States, the practice of retail-based rent-to-own businesses began to develop in the 1950s and 1960s. Individuals cited as key figures in the history of the rent-to-own transaction and application as a business model include Charles Loudermilk Sr., who in 1955 began renting out Army surplus chairs and later founded Aaron Rents, and J. Ernest Talley, who started Mr. T’s Rental in Wichita, Kansas in 1963, and later helped establish Rent-A-Center.

In response to a growing desire to share information, develop uniform practices and procedures, and cultivate a positive public image within the growing rent-to-own industry in the United States, rent-to-own dealers established a trade association, the Association of Progressive Rental Organizations (APRO), in 1980. APRO began with approximately 40 original member companies and elected an initial board of 16. Today the association has approximately 350 member companies representing approximately 10,400 stores in all 50 states, Mexico and Canada. Rent-to-own serves 4.8 million customers at any given time in the year. In South Africa, one of the fastest growing rent-to-own markets in the world, sales are projected to reach US$357.36 million in revenue by 2025, with an estimated 3.79 million users.

=== Transaction structure ===
Rent-to-own agreements are based on a weekly or monthly rental term. In the structure of this type of transaction, the consumer (lessee)—at the end of each week or month—can choose either to renew the lease on a weekly or monthly basis by making renewal payments, or to terminate the agreement with no further obligation by returning the tangible property. Though not obligated to do so, the consumer can choose to continue making interval payments on the merchandise for a pre-specified period of time, at which point they would own the good outright. An alternative purchase option is commonly provisioned for, allowing the consumer to pay off the remaining balance on the agreement at any point in time in order to obtain permanent ownership.

According to a Federal Trade Commission (FTC) survey on the rent-to-own industry in the United States conducted in 2000, consumers reported that they chose to engage in rent-to-own transactions for a variety of reasons, including: "the lack of a credit check", "the ability to obtain merchandise they otherwise could not", and, "the convenience and flexibility of the transaction". The most common reason cited for dissatisfaction within the survey was high prices. In addition, some survey respondents reported poor treatment by employees in connection with late rental payments, problems with repair services, and hidden or added costs.

The cost incurred by consumers in rent-to-own transactions has been the subject of long-term debate and differing opinion. Historically, consumer advocates, some U.S. state attorneys general and some academic researchers have expressed concern that consumers entering into rent-to-own agreements may be unaware of the potentially high long-term costs of rent-to-own in comparison to traditional installment or layaway plans. Often mentioned alongside most critiques is the question of whether prices paid for services of this type are adequate for lower-income individuals who can least afford additional financial outlays. At the same time, other academic researchers and representatives of industry associations have contended that rent-to-own transactions are not comparable to traditional methods of purchasing or financing consumer goods, in that they include services such as delivery, assembly, service and repair, all of which are factored into the higher assessed value and corresponding price charged. Also frequently noted by proponents of the unique nature of rent-to-own transactions is the point that they are not obligations to purchase, since the agreement can be terminated by the lessee at any point in time with the return of the property.

=== Lease versus sale ===
The legal controversy surrounding rent-to-own transactions has centered primarily on the question of whether the transaction should be treated as a lease or a credit sale. The industry has contended that the transaction is a lease; while consumer advocacy groups have advocated for the transaction to be treated as a credit sale. As of 2011, forty-seven U.S. states, Guam, Puerto Rico, and the District of Columbia have passed laws characterizing the transaction as a lease. Of the five U.S. state supreme courts that have addressed the question, three (Massachusetts, Arkansas and Maine) concluded that the transaction was a lease. New Jersey and Minnesota concluded it was a credit sale based upon those states’ credit laws. A federal district court in Wisconsin also found the transaction to be a credit sale under Wisconsin state law.

As of 2011, no U.S. federal consumer protection law specifically addresses rent-to-own transactions, but through litigation, efforts have been made in attempt to bring rent-to-own agreements under the definition of "credit sale" in the Truth in Lending Act. However, courts have not, as of 2011, ruled in favor of making this change at a federal level. In 2006, the United States Department of Defense labeled rent-to-own a predatory lending practice, defining it as an, "unfair or abusive loan or credit sale transaction or collection practice", along with payday loans, title loans, refund anticipation loans and other similar practices. In 2007, the United States Government Accountability Office raised concerns with the methodology and structure of this research. Later in the same year, the Department of Defense ultimately concluded that rent-to-own was not a form of credit and excluded it from its regulation on predatory lending practices.

=== Collection practices ===
Consumer advocates and plaintiffs testifying in legal proceedings have at times alleged that rent-to-own stores routinely repossess merchandise when a consumer is close to acquiring ownership. At the time of a 2000 FTC survey, individuals who engaged in rent-to-own transactions reported a "low incidence of late-term repossessions", which the FTC suggested might be due to the reinstatement rights mandated in most states, as these rights allow consumers to reinstate this type of contract after repossession.

== Real estate ==
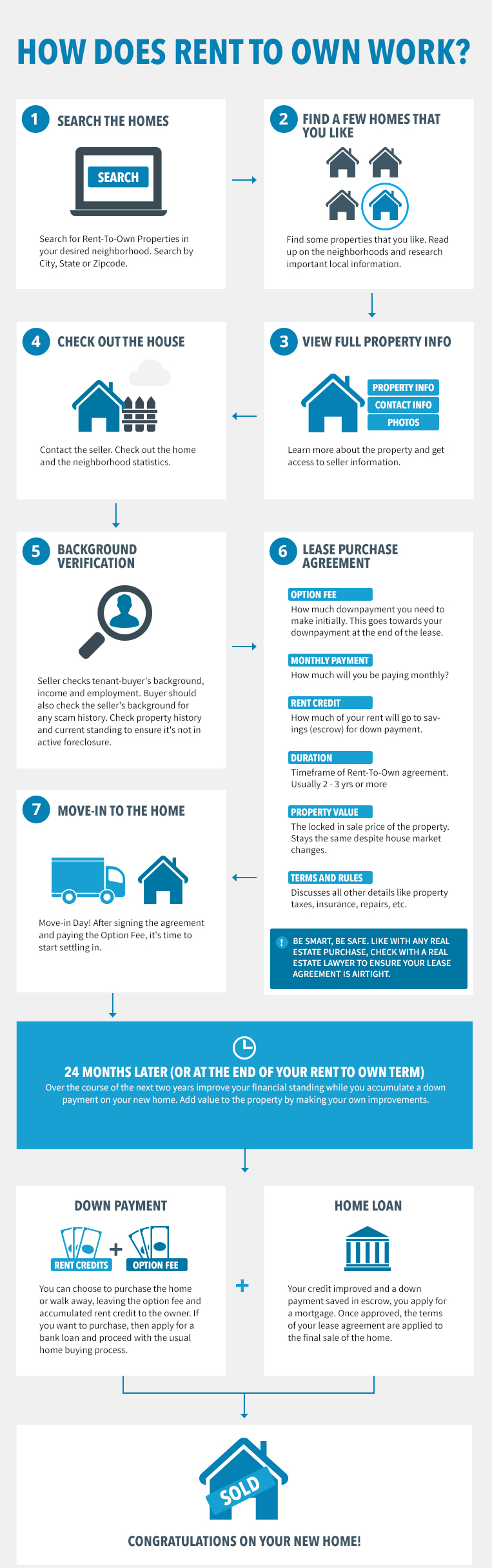
A typical rent-to-own process. May vary by country and by US state.

While rent-to-own transactions are most commonly conducted for purchasing consumer goods at a retail store, this term also describes a specialized real estate agreement. The rent-to-own housing option is typically exercised more often during housing market downturns, such as the 2008 financial crisis. Because the most recent housing market downturn was accompanied by protective regulatory scrutiny of lending practices and consumer credit agencies, acquiring a loan has become more difficult for Subprime borrowers.

=== Imperfect credit scores ===
Tenant/buyers who have imperfect credit scores are typically drawn to rent-to-own properties since the lease terms allow them to live in the home while they take the steps necessary to fix their credit and secure a mortgage. Most lease purchase agreements allow them to lock in a market rate when they sign the contract. People with poor credit find the leasing period a crucial opportunity to repair their financial profile to secure a loan. A common complaint tenant/buyers have with rent-to-own agreements, however, stems from their inability to secure a loan in time to purchase the property, whether due to insufficient downpayment or credit, at which point they are left to restructure the agreement or forced to walk away.

=== Transaction structure ===
In a rent-to-own transaction, the tenant lives on the real property and pay towards purchasing the property at a fixed price within a specific period of time, usually one to three years. As part of the contract, the renter may be required to make a nonrefundable deposit often included as part of a down payment at the end of the lease term. In addition to monthly rent, often an additional amount called a rent credit is paid into an escrow account during the lease period. This amount is added to the deposit and used as part of the down payment at the end of the lease term. This pushes the rent above the market rate but helps build savings for purchase if the buy option is taken. At the end of the lease term, the tenant is offered right of first refusal to purchase the property at the agreed upon sale price, or walk away and forfeit the deposit. If the tenant is unable or unwilling to exercise the option to buy, the owner is then free to rent or sell the property to another buyer, or to restructure the contract.

=== Scams ===
Because rent-to-own real estate contracts are flexible open-source documents, there is room for scammers to take advantage of unprepared tenants.

== See also ==
- Alternative financial services
- Closed-end leasing
- Hire purchase
- Vehicle leasing
