= Deep pocket =

US slang, "wealthy"

Deep pocket is an American slang term; it usually means "extensive financial wealth or resources". It is typically used in reference to big companies or organizations (e.g. the American tobacco companies have "deep pockets"), although it can be used in reference to wealthy individuals (e.g., Bill Gates, Warren Buffett).

In the context of a lawsuit, the deep pocket is often the target defendant, even when the true (moral) culpability is with another party because the deep pocket has money to pay a verdict. For example, a lawyer may comment that they sued the manufacturer of a product rather than the seller because the manufacturer has the deep pockets, meaning it has more money than the seller with which to compensate the victim and profit the attorney.

== Deep pocket as a slang term ==
The term “deep pockets” (also given as “deep pocket” and “deep pocketed") is attested sparsely in the 1940s through the 1960s, but became popular with the litigation explosion of the 1970s.

A person with “short arms and deep pockets” is a person (sometimes derided as “miserly” or “cheap") who saves money and doesn't often spend it. The term “short arms and deep/long pockets” is cited in print from at least 1952.

In Ireland, this phrase was attached to a wealthy businessman from Tipperary who, upon his round of drinks, would break his glass on the floor, knowing the owner of the pub would ask him to leave. This was also called the “O’Shea Fiddle”.

== Deep pocket in law and economics ==
Deep pocket is a concept often used in the law and economics of tort law. It refers to the idea that the risk of an activity should be borne by a person who is in a relatively good position to handle it. This can be achieved by either spreading the risk over a large number of risk-bearers (usually by means of insurance), or by imposing it on a person who is relatively risk-neutral. The latter is often assumed to be the case for wealthy individuals or large corporations, who are referred to as having "deep pockets", since their wealth will not be affected very strongly if the risk materializes. For example, a deep-pocket argument might, among other arguments, be used to justify product liability, as producers with "deep pockets" will normally be better able to accommodate the risk of damages than individual consumers not endowed with "deep pockets".

In 2014, the Supreme Court of Iowa labeled such legal theories deep pocket jurisprudence. A review found four types of application:

- Innovator liability holds an inventor of a product liable for the harms caused when others independently manufacture the same product.
- Governments may sue manufacturers and anyone in the supply chain, holding them broadly liable for harms caused by independent misuse or abuse of a product.
- Businesses may be held liable for harms caused by employees of independent contractors.
- When the true party at fault for misusing a product is unable to pay for harms they caused, the manufacturer may be held liable on a speculative theory of the product design contributing to a mishap.

A variation on the term refers to the special subtype of frivolous litigation where plaintiffs target wealthy or corporate defendants for little other reason than them having high resources. These cases involve plaintiffs who have suffered genuine damages, but what is considered the "true" culpability lies squarely with an individual or small entity who has very little money that could be collected if the suit was won. Instead, the plaintiff targets the nearest marginally related large corporation or wealthy defendant, often with a weak accusation of negligence. A popular example is a person being shot by a criminal, and suing the manufacturer of the firearm instead of their attacker. Sometimes legislation is passed to prevent such lawsuits, such as the Protection of Lawful Commerce in Arms Act.

== See also ==
- Judgment proofing, a maneuver in which a "deep pocket" positions wealth to escape liability.
- Lady Justice, whose blindfold represents no bias for a claimant's status, such as wealth or poverty.
- Safe harbor laws and regulations, which provide immunity from liability for compliant products and practices.
