= Goeasy =

Canadian alternative financial company

goeasy Ltd.
- Type: Public
- Traded as: TSX: GSY
- Industry: Financial services
- Founded: 1990; 36 years ago
- Headquarters: Mississauga, Ontario, Canada
- Key people: David Ingram (Executive Chairman), Patrick Ens (President and CEO)
- Website: www.goeasy.com

goeasy Ltd. is a Canadian alternative financial services company based in Mississauga, Ontario. It operates with three business units – easyfinancial, which offers loans to non-prime borrowers; easyhome, which sells furniture and other durable goods on a lease-to-own basis; and LendCare, a provider of point-of-sale consumer financing.

As of September 30, 2025, goeasy reported a consumer loan portfolio of $5.44 billion and quarterly revenue of $440 million.

== History ==
goeasy Ltd. was founded in 1990 as RTO Enterprises. It went public on the Toronto Stock Exchange in 1993, through a reverse takeover. Its original focus was leasing furniture. The company's original focus was offering customers furniture and appliances through a lease-to-own model.

In 2003, it renamed itself easyhome, as an attempt to create a nationwide brand, and subsequently went on to become Canada's largest lease-to-own company with stores across Canada. In 2008, easyhome acquired Insta-Rent for $10 million. Around this time, the company launched easyfinancial, its financial services arm. easyfinancial was responsible for most of the growth of the company in the following years, with the easyfinancial segment eclipsing the easyhome segment in revenue by 2016.

In 2012, easyhome was forced to re-state its financial statements, and the majority of its board of directors resigned. In March 2014, there was speculation that easyhome might acquire some of the locations of struggling payday lender Cash Store. After Cash Store went out of business, easyhome acquired 47 former Cash Store locations in early 2015.

In 2016, easyhome changed its corporate name to goeasy, retaining the easyhome name for its rent-to-own durable goods business. The change was made to reflect the increasing diversity of the company's activities.

In 2017, the company recapitalized the business with $530 million in financing to help fuel its future growth. During this time, the company also launched a secured lending product to provide homeowners with lower rates and higher loan amounts. The company also expanded into the Quebec market under easyfinancière, and also added lending services at its easyhome locations.

In 2018, David Ingram, who had been President and CEO since 2001, took on a new role as Executive Chairman of the board. Jason Mullins, who previously held the role of Chief Operating Officer, became President and CEO in January 2019. That same year, the company also launched its next-generation proprietary online loan application as well as creditplus, its secured savings loan that helps customers rebuild their credit.

In April 2021, goeasy acquired LendCare, a leading provider of point of care financing, for $320 million, accelerating goeasy's growth through product and point-of-sale channel expansion. The acquisition is expected to contribute to goeasy's earnings growth.

In March 2025, Dan Rees was appointed chief executive officer. In December 2025, goeasy announced that Rees would step down effective December 31, 2025, and that Patrick Ens would become chief executive officer effective January 1, 2026.

== Business ==
goeasy operates through two reportable segments: easyfinancial and easyhome. LendCare is included within the easyfinancial segment.

== Financial performance ==
In 2024, goeasy reported revenue of $1.52 billion and operating income of $610 million, and ended the year with a consumer loan portfolio of $4.60 billion and total assets of $5.19 billion.

== Operations ==
easyfinancial and easyhome principally target customers whose credit is not good enough for a bank loan, or who need more immediate access to credit than that offered by traditional lenders. easyfinancial and easyhome offer better rates and terms than so-called payday loans. goeasy's customers are often non-prime Canadians trying to rebuild credit.

easyhome, Canada's largest lease-to-own company has been in operation since 1990, and consists of leasing furniture, appliances, and electronics to customers on a rent-to-own basis, which can be transacted online or at one of their 165 locations across Canada. Customers generally own the product at the end of the lease term. No down payment or credit checks are required. easyhome charges an interest rate of 29.9% on its leases and offers flexible options. However, the total effective interest rate might be higher, given easyhome's higher initial prices in comparison to other retailers.

easyfinancial principally offers installment loans of $500 to $20,000, mainly unsecured, at annual interest rates from 29.99% to 46.96% annual rate. It also offers a suite of both unsecured and secured lending products up to $75,000 with rates starting at 9.99% annually. easyfinancial operates through in-store kiosks, as well as stand-alone branches and an online website. It had 210 kiosks and branches as of 2016. In 2016, 15% of easyfinancial loans went bad, a rate much higher than that of banks. The company operates with an omnichannel business model that allows customers to transact through their national branch network of over 240 locations, online or through one of their many retail and merchant partnerships.

=== Footprint ===
Customers can apply online and through a national branch network of over 400 locations across Canada, along with point-of-sale financing offered through merchant partners.

== Community involvement ==
goeasy has been working with the Boys & Girls Clubs of Canada since 2004. In that time, goeasy has organized national fundraising campaigns, raising more than one million dollars for the organization. They continue to support the Boys and Girls Club. In 2014, goeasy launched easybites, with a $2.5 million donation and a commitment to build 100 safe and functioning kitchens in Boys & Girls Clubs across the country. easybites has grown into an annual fundraising campaign called “Feed the Future” which is well ahead of its 10-year goal of having donated 40 kitchens at the close of 2018.

The easybites program makes it easier for Boys & Girls Clubs of Canada to offer nutritious meals and snacks to youth visiting the centers. Renovating the kitchen spaces also enables more locations to provide cooking and nutrition classes. Boys & Girls Clubs in Midland, Sarnia, Cranbrook, Cornwall, Yarmouth, Toronto, Ponoka, and Charlottetown have benefited from the easybites program. goeasy branches often remain involved with their local Boys & Girls Clubs well after the new kitchens are installed.

== Controversy ==
easyhome has often been criticized for its high prices, often hidden through relatively small monthly payments spread over a long period. For instance, in 2012, a Hewlett Packard PC which could be bought outright for a few hundred dollars had a total cost of $2,000 at easyhome, spread out over three years. In 2015, the total cost of a 55-inch curved Samsung TV was estimated to be more than twice as much at easyhome than at a conventional electronics retailer. Easyfinancial has similarly been criticized for its high interest rates, with an average annual rate of around 50%. Many loans offered by easyfinancial are very close to the maximum rate of interest in Canada of 60%.

In February 2015, CBC Marketplace, an investigative consumer advocacy TV series, ran an episode focusing on easyfinancial's business tactics. Beyond the high interest rates charged, easyfinancial was also criticized for deceptive and misleading business practices. For instance, easyfinancial generally includes insurance in its loans, but does not quote the cost of the insurance in the cost of the loan. The insurance often doubles the effective interest rate of the loan. Easyfinancial also does not make clear that the insurance is optional. Easyfinancial was also criticized for pushing its customers into "debt traps" by offering re-financing, often before the original loan is paid off. Often, the company did not clearly communicate to its customers the eventual cost of the loans it offered.

In 2016, easyhome apologized for running a print flyer featuring an OMFG sale, because of the offensiveness of that acronym.
