= Vehicle leasing =

Leasing of motor vehicles

Vehicle leasing is the leasing (or the use) of a motor vehicle for a fixed period of time at an agreed amount of money for the lease.

It is commonly offered by dealers as an alternative to vehicle purchase but is widely used by businesses as a method of acquiring (or having the use of) vehicles for business, without the usually needed cash outlay. The key difference in a lease is that after the primary term (usually 2, 3 or 4 years) the vehicle has to either be returned to the leasing company or purchased for the residual value.

== Rationale ==
Vehicle leasing offers advantages to both buyers and sellers. For the buyer, lease payments will usually be lower than payments on a car loan would be. In most states, any sales tax is due only on each monthly payment, rather than immediately on the entire purchase price as in the case of an instalment sale or loan.

Some consumers may prefer leasing, as it allows them to simply return a car and select a new model when the lease expires, allowing a consumer to drive a new vehicle every few years with no worries of having any negative equity upon turning their vehicle in unlike when one trades in a purchased vehicle after only 2 or 3 years of ownership.

The lease vehicle is in theory always under factory warranty, and as a result, the lessee doesn't have to pay for repairs. A lessee does not have to worry about the future value of the vehicle, while a vehicle owner does. Almost all leases include a fixed purchase price at lease end so if the vehicle is worth more than the predicted value, the lessee can buy it but if it is worth less, the lessee can return it.

For a business lessor there are tax advantages to be considered. The consumer lessee also pays less sales tax over the life of the lease than purchasing the vehicle.

For the seller, leasing generates income from a vehicle the seller (or manufacturing corporation or its finance subsidiary) still owns and will be able to lease again or sell through vehicle remarketing once the original (or primary) lease has expired. As consumers will typically use a leased vehicle for a shorter period of time than one they buy outright, leasing may generate repeat customers more quickly, which may fit into various aspects of a dealer's business model. Also, lessees have greater loyalty to the same vehicle manufacturer than do buyers.

Each vehicle is backed by a manufacturer's warranty that can be utilized at any authorized dealer. To maintain the warranty's validity, it is necessary to regularly service the vehicle, following the manufacturer's recommendations.

== Market penetration ==
Leasing's average retail market penetration rate in the United States for new passenger vehicles reached an all-time record high of 26.5% in February 2014. This represents a recovery from a severe drop during the 2008 financial crisis. As of 2016, leasing accounted for about 25 percent of total vehicle sales and 31 percent retail sales in the United States.

The prevalence of leasing in the United States for GM, Ford and Chrysler has risen close to the industry norm after reaching low single digits in 2009, but is still lower than BMW and Mercedes-Benz.

== Lease agreement ==
Lease agreements typically stipulate an early termination fee and limit the number of miles a lessee can drive (for passenger cars, a common number is 10,000 miles per annum though the amount can be stipulated by the customer and can be 5,000 to 25,000 miles per year). If the mileage allowance is exceeded, fees may apply. Dealers will typically allow a lessee to negotiate a higher mileage allowance, for a higher lease payment.

Lease agreements usually specify how much wear on the vehicle is allowable, and the lessee may face a fee if that amount of wear has been exceeded. A lease with maintenance (commonly known in the UK as Contract Hire) can include all vehicle running costs excluding fuel and insurance.

The actual lease payments are calculated in a very similar way to loan payments, but instead of an APR, the company uses something called the money factor.

At the end of a lease's term, the lessee must either return the vehicle to or buy it from the owner. The end of lease price is usually agreed upon when the lease is signed.

Typically a leasing company will have a minimum length of lease such as 24 months up-to 60 months. Recently a new view on leasing is that the market has grown for short term lease called 'flexi-lease'. Flexi-lease is when a person can lease a new vehicle for 3 months and then choose to hand the car/van back or indeed extend the lease for another period. This is almost the same as van hire but typically involves the finance or leasing company maintaining and being ultimately responsible for the vehicle.

Some companies, such as Renault Eurodrive, offer what is known as a short term car lease in Europe. This product aims to provide a car lease free of VAT to non-european residents, the car being registered under the customer's name. The program is 50 years old and started with the French car makers Renault, Peugeot and Citroën. The offer includes a brand new car, full risk insurance and 24 hours assistance and is, in many ways, similar to a car rental. At the end of their stay, the car "owner" returns the car, and has nothing else to pay.

== Criticism ==
=== Company cars for employee use ===
In some countries, companies may lease vehicles not just for their top managers, but rather all their employees (regardless on whether they actually need the car for business trips, or even any company tasks). This adds to traffic congestion. There are sometimes tax benefits (tax deductions and depreciation write-offs) to the employers by giving a car instead of a raise or a bonus. Transport and Environment has stated that Europe is subsidising pollution and climate change in this way.

Alternatives such as remote work could be used to reduce the use of vehicles for transport between work and home, as could a modal shift towards non-motorized transport, such as cycling, the use of public transport, and the use of corporate car sharing.

== See also ==
- Car rental
- Closed-end leasing
- Cross-border leasing
- Hire purchase
