= Standard Business Reporting =

Group of accounting software programs

Standard Business Reporting is a group of international programs instigated by a number of governments to reduce the regulatory burden for business. The concept is to make business the centre when it comes to managing business-to-government reporting obligations.* Businesses conduct their own financial administration; the facts they record and decisions they make should drive their reporting. The government should be able to receive and process this information without imposing undue constraints on how businesses administer their finances.

The method used to achieve this goal is to define a "common language" (or taxonomy) using appropriate standards such as XBRL, XML and JSON, then provide systems to process information classified under the taxonomy.

== History ==
The Dutch Taxonomy Project (Nederlandse Taxonomie Project) or NTP began in 2004 as part of the Dutch cabinet's objectives to reduce the administrative burdens on businesses. The project was sponsored jointly by the Dutch Ministries of Finance and Justice. The following steps were taken before they would implement NTP (which later on would change its name to SBR) at a larger scale.

XBRL Taxonomy and Digipoort

In 2004/2005, the Dutch government developed the OverheidsTransactiePoort (OTP), the predecessor of the current 'Digipoort'. A new channel to communicate with various public organizations. By using a digital certificate, organizations can legally communicate with, for example, the Tax and Customs Administration, Netherlands Chamber of Commerce and the Statistics Netherlands (CBS).

In cooperation with these organizations joint agreements were made about the definitions used in business records. The NTP then created an XBRL taxonomy. XBRL is an open standard "language" for the digital exchange of reports. The taxonomy "enables businesses to generate the required reporting information directly from their own records and the government, to then process this information efficiently and effectively". [7]

Data exchange via Digipoort takes place through XBRL as much as possible.

First annual accounts and electronic declaration

The Dutch government filed the first annual reports in XBRL in 2006. Upon receipt, several private parties (11 intermediaries, 22 software suppliers, 8 professional organizations), Statistics Netherlands, the Dutch Business Register and several Ministries concluded a covenant on the standardization of accountability processes and the further development of ICT facilities or applications. The Confederation of Netherlands Industry and Employers (known as VNO-NCW), The Royal Association MKB-Nederland and more intermediaries and software suppliers also adhere to the covenant. Together they continued to build the necessary infrastructure, with the electronic filing of tax returns as a successful result at the end of 2008 and the first credit reports to the banking sector in 2010.

International adoption

The Dutch approach was adopted by the Australian government in 2006, which established the Standard Business Reporting (SBR) Program. In addition to Australia, other countries (including New Zealand) are also planning to apply this approach. This approach has since been internationally designated as Standard Business Reporting.

From NTP to SBR

In December 2008, the Dutch government decided to rename the NTP to the Standard Business Reporting (SBR) Programme, thus adopting the name introduced by Australia. The Dutch SBR programme has been tasked with deepening and embedding the results obtained so far and broadening the scope to other domains and applications.

Further developments

The private sector also recognizes the benefits of standardization. In November 2009, the Dutch government announced that three Dutch banks would switch to SBR for their credit reports.

In 2010, governments scaled up by investing in a mature management organization, in information provision and in the systems at the e-government service for the Netherlands (Logius), and the requesting parties.

Partly due to the mandatory electronic tax return and the submission of annual reports to the Netherlands Business Register, more than 7.7 million deliveries and 2.1 returns and 5.7 million authorizations were counted in 2014.

In March 2017, the Data Foundation and PwC published a research report explaining how the adoption of Standard Business Reporting (SBR) in the United States would reduce costs for both companies and agencies. The report, "Standard Business Reporting: Open Data to Cut Compliance Costs", defines SBR as multiple regulatory agencies adopting a common open data structure for the information they collect.

As of 2017, most medium-sized companies in the Netherlands must file annual reports via SBR. The annual report is provided with a digital auditor's report and the signature of the auditor. The SBR Assurance approach has been specifically developed for this purpose.

Forecast reporting

The number of data flows in the Netherlands was expanded in 2018. Followed by the annual reports of educational institutions and housing associations. Based on the figures from annual reports, a forecast report for residential construction would be made for the first time in 2018 through SBR.

== Implementations ==
=== Dutch implementation ===
In its 2020-2025 Roadmap, SBR in the Netherlands describes itself as a public-private cooperation (PPC) that serves the public interest by providing clear and usable solutions for high quality electronic exchange of (financial) reports and related messages. The PPC states that SBR helps to meet with legal requirements such as timeliness, unambiguity, conformity and irrefutability. Trust – mutual confidence in the digital economy – is key here.

==== Participation ====
Participants in this PPC are, amongst others, companies, software suppliers, intermediaries, accountants, banks, insurers, institutions and authorities, tax authority, business register, Statistics Netherlands, housing corporations and several public organisations.

==== Aim ====
In 2025 the SBR public-private cooperation in the Netherlands aims for all Dutch organizations to electronically exchange their data safely, swiftly, easily and flawlessly in a structured and standardised manner.

==== Value proposition ====
The standards used provide for unambiguous, structured, transparent, available, comparable, reusable and relevant data thanks to their open nature; can be used as building blocks; make system-to-system exchange the standard and therefore reduce the number of manual or paper data transactions; are proven concept and build trust among its users.

Its network is a broad coalition of stakeholders making agreements based on consensus; is aimed at (international) collaboration with other organisations and initiatives.

Its approach is aimed at a future proof system of agreements with activities that contribute to its goal; responds to the needs of stakeholders; clarifies the added value of SBR per target group; uses (new) technologies.

==== Strategic goals 2020-2025 ====
- The PPC aims for high quality and future proof electronic data exchange.
- The PPC innovates its ways of working and strengthens its knowledge, skills and communication.
- The PPC maintains and strengthens its relationship with stakeholders.

=== Australian implementation ===
The 2006 report of the Taskforce on Reducing Regulatory Burdens on Business, "Rethinking Regulation" (the Banks report), recognised that government reporting requirements impose a significant burden on Australian business.

The objective of the SBR Program in Australia is to reduce the cost of reporting for business by A$800 million over six years at a cost of A$320 million over the same period.

The key activity of the SBR Program is to work across agencies and jurisdictions to standardise the reporting approach and language – developing the taxonomy. As well as the reporting language, SBR is developing a new e-channel for business which will include a single sign-on to on-line services across the agencies that are in scope.

==== Scope ====
The agencies in scope are:

- Australian Taxation Office (ATO)
- Australian Bureau of Statistics (ABS)
- Australian Securities & Investments Commission (ASIC)
- Australian Prudential Regulation Authority (APRA)
- State and Territory Revenue Offices (8 of them)

More than 75 government forms are in scope to be rationalised and replaced by electronic lodgments.

==== Planned solution ====
The Australian SBR solution is planned to be developed as follows:

- Rationalise and harmonise the reporting terms and definitions in use
- Develop a Reporting Taxonomy
- Map the Reporting Taxonomy to a chart of accounts (provided via a software package)
- Develop IT capabilities and infrastructure, including:
  - Whole of Government authentication/single sign on process; and
  - System for secure on-line interactions
- Connect government systems to the IT capabilities and infrastructure
- Connect businesses to government systems via third-party software

==== Business Advisory Forum ====
The SBR program also created the SBR Business Advisory Forum as a way to provide ongoing consultation to the project. It is made up of 18 representatives drawn from industry groups (e.g. Council of Small Business Organisations of Australia, professional associations (e.g. CPA Australia) and the SBR program itself.

=== New Zealand implementation ===
In May 2008 the New Zealand Ministry of Economic Development published a business case for adopting an SBR program. The business case states that success relies on a high take-up rate by intermediaries such as accountants and lawyers. This is because many owner-operators and small businesses (68% and 21% of businesses, respectively) conduct their reporting via these third parties.

The business case states that "SBR will deliver compliance cost reductions to business by reducing the need for them to submit information to multiple agencies, standardising data definitions and implementing a standard communication language.".
