= BGC Canada =

Canadian nonprofit organization

- Formation: 1900
- Type: Youth organization
- Legal status: Non-profit organization
- Headquarters: Toronto, Ontario
- Region served: Canada
- President & CEO: Owen Charters
- Website: bgccan.com

BGC Canada (Formerly known as Boys & Girls Clubs of Canada) is a national, nonprofit organization that supports local BGC Clubs with programs for physical activity, healthy living, learning, job training, leadership, and creative expression. With locations in small towns and large cities, as well as rural and Indigenous communities, BGC Clubs provide services to young people during critical out-of-school hours.

== History ==
In 1900, a group of concerned local citizens in Saint John, New Brunswick set up a "public playground movement" to provide a safe place for children to play, in particular boys from disadvantaged circumstances who had no place to go after school. Originally established as the "Every Day Club," it was later named The East End Boys Club of Saint John, the first "Boys Club" in Canada.

In 1929, the Boys’ Club Federation of Canada was officially established by Vernon McAdam, the first National Executive Director. In 1947, the organization was renamed Boys’ Clubs of Canada, and a year later was recognized by Parliament of Canada as a national, nonprofit organization. In 1974, to reflect the growing number of young girls participating in Club programs, the organization changed its name to "Boys and Girls Clubs of Canada."

During the COVID-19 pandemic, BGC Canada received a $500,000 grant from the Public Health Agency of Canada's Immunization Partnership Fund to combat vaccine hesitancy and promote COVID-19 vaccine uptake in families and youth accessing BGC programs.

== Size and reach ==
As of 2019, BGC Canada serves 200,000 children and youth at 700 service locations across the country. The Clubs employ 6,720 staff members and have 18,200 volunteers. In 2018, BGC Canada offered 26 national programs, facilitated $182,270 in scholarships, and allocated $6.2 million in grants to Clubs. Since 1900, Boys and Girls Clubs have helped over 3 million young Canadians.

== Board of directors ==
The voluntary Board of Directors provides national leadership, making policy directions and decisions and assigning responsibilities for implementation and management to the President & CEO.

2019 National Board

Officers

- Felix Wu, Chair
- Thomas Clift, Vice-Chair
- David Mather, Treasurer / BGCC Foundation Chair
- Holly Toupin, Secretary

Directors

- Becky Penrice
- Michelle Banik
- Gordon Floyd
- Nicole Galarneau
- Sarah Midanik
- Rachel Barry
- Shawn Cornett
- Bob Harriman
- Trevor Daroux
- Davinder Valeri

== See also ==
- Boys & Girls Clubs of America
