= Business activity statement =

The business activity statement is a form submitted to the Australian Taxation Office by registered business entities to report their tax obligations, including goods and services tax, pay as you go withholding, pay as you go instalments, fringe benefits tax, wine equalisation tax and luxury car tax. Pay as you go withholding is sometimes known as income tax withholding, and pay as you go instalments is sometimes known as income tax instalments".

The Australian Taxation Office forwards a business activity statement tailor made for each registered business entity before the end of each reporting period. It may be delivered to the business as a paper form, electronically, or via the business's registered tax agent. Parts of the form may be pre-filled.

Related to the business activity statement is the instalment activity statement, which is used by taxpayers who are not registered for the goods and services tax, but have other tax obligations. An instalment activity statement is also used by entities that prepare a quarterly business activity statement but are required to remit their pay as you go withholding tax on a monthly basis.

The business activity statement reporting system was introduced in 2000 as a part of a major tax reform, which also included the introduction of the goods and services tax. The various forms and reporting methods have changed considerably since the initial introduction of the business activity statement.

== Types ==
There are a number of different business activity statement forms which an organisation can complete. The form which a business receives depends on what tax liabilities it has, referred to as roles. Forms are usually issued quarterly, some roles can be reported at different frequencies depending on the business structure and income. Some roles such as goods and services tax can be reported annually, subject to eligibility criteria being met. The business activity statement forms are required.

== Frequency ==
Activity statements are usually required to be submitted quarterly, but some entities may be required to report obligations on a more frequent basis.

Some entities may be required to report pay as you go withholding liabilities or goods and services tax on a monthly basis.

== Operations ==
Every activity statement carries a unique document identification number. Activity statements can be submitted to the tax office on paper (mail), by phone, electronically (via a tax agent's electronic lodgment system), or through the Australian Taxation Office business portal.

Activity statements are processed by the Australian Taxation Office through its operations sub-plan. Any errors which occur with activity statements are usually handled by a department known as activity statement product (exceptions). This department operates under the operations sub-plan, client account services business service line. Errors may occur when a business client reports figures incorrectly, where a client includes cent figures (only dollar figures are allowable), where an arithmetic error occurs, when a statement is submitted when no roles are active for the client, or when the handwriting on a paper statement is illegible.

== Methods of preparation ==
The primary methods that businesses use to prepare and submit their business activity statement include:

- Accountant
- Bookkeeper
- Tax software
- Australian Taxation Office website
- Manually, by themselves
- Standard business reporting

== See also ==
- Taxation in Australia
