= Akmal Burkhanov =

Uzbekistani politician

- Akmal Burxanov Eshondedaevich
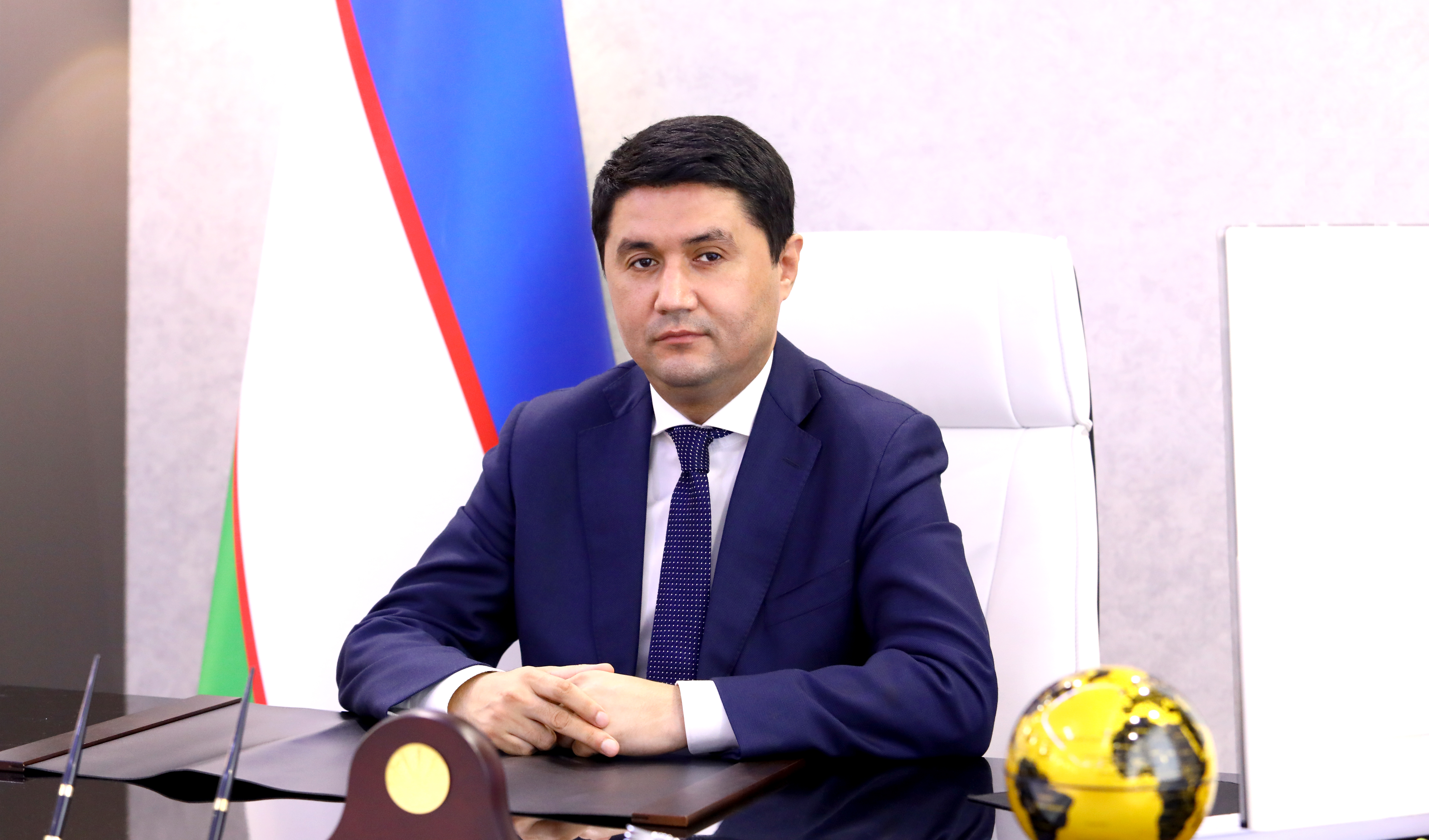

Anti-Corruption Agency of the Republic of Uzbekistan
- Incumbent
- Assumed office 14 July 2020
- President: Shavkat Mirziyoyev
- Prime Minister: Abdulla Aripov

Personal details
- Born: Akmal Eshondedaevich Burkhanov; May 26, 1981 (age 45) Namangan, Namangan Region, Uzbek SSR, Soviet Union
- Party: Adolat Social Democratic Party
- Education: Tashkent State Law Institute; Nagoya University; Nagoya University of Economics
- Occupation: Politician
- Profession: Lawyer
- Awards: State awards named after "Shuhrat", "30th Anniversary of the Independence of the Republic of Uzbekistan", "25 Years of the Constitution of Uzbekistan"

Akmal Eshondedayevich Burkhanov (born 26 May 1981) is an Uzbek public and political figure, Deputy of the Legislative Chamber of the Oliy Majlis of the Republic of Uzbekistan of the third and fourth convocations, Director of the Development Strategy Center (2017–2019), Chairman of the Yuksalish Nationwide Movement (2019–2020), and since July 14, 2020, Director of the Anti-Corruption Agency of the Republic of Uzbekistan.

== Career ==
Burkhanov graduated with honors from the Tashkent State Institute of Law in 2001 with a bachelor's degree. He began his professional career at the Ministry of Justice of Uzbekistan the same year and held various positions there from 2002 to 2008. In 2003, he graduated with honors from the same institution with a master's degree. He completed a master's program at Nagoya University in 2007 and undertook internships at the Japanese company Toyota Gosei in 2006 and the Russian Law Academy in 2009.

From 2009 to 2015, Burkhanov served as the executive director of the Nagoya University Office in Uzbekistan. In 2014, he was elected to the Legislative Chamber of the Oliy Majlis of the Republic of Uzbekistan and served as a member of the Committee on International Affairs and Inter-Parliamentary Ties. He was a member of the Uzbekistan–Japan Inter-Parliamentary Group from 2015 to 2020, the OSCE Parliamentary Assembly from 2015 to 2019, and the Uzbekistan–United States Inter-Parliamentary Group from 2016 to 2019.

From 2017 to 2019, Burkhanov served as the executive director of the Development Strategy Center and was a member of the Parliamentary Commission for the Support of Civil Society Institutions. Since 2018, he has been a member of the Advisory Council for the Development of Civil Society under the President of Uzbekistan. In 2019, he was re-elected to the Legislative Chamber of the Oliy Majlis for a second term. From 2019 to 2020, he served as Chairman of the Yuksalish Nationwide Movement. In 2018, he was awarded Uzbekistan's "Shuhrat" Medal.

In 2020, Burkhanov was appointed Director of the Anti-Corruption Agency of the Republic of Uzbekistan. Since that year, he has also been a member of the Public Council at the Agency for Management Efficiency under the president of Uzbekistan. Since 2021, he has been a member of the scientific advisory board under the Supreme Court of Uzbekistan. In 2023, he received a Doctor of Science (DSc) degree in law. Since 2024, he has been a member of the Criminology Council. Since 2025, he has been a member of the CIS Interstate Council on Combating Corruption.
