= Layaway =

Purchase agreement

Layaway (lay-by in Australia, New Zealand, and South Africa) is a purchase agreement in which the seller reserves an item for a consumer until the consumer completes all the payments necessary to pay for that item, and only then hands over the item.

== Description ==
Rather than taking the item home and then repaying the debt on a regular schedule, as in most installment plans or hire purchases, the layaway customer does not receive the item until it is completely paid for. There is sometimes a fee associated, since the seller must "lay" the item "away" in storage until the payments are completed. Because there is little risk involved for the seller, layaway can be readily offered to those with bad credit. If the transaction is not completed, the item is returned to stock; the customer's money may be returned in whole, returned less a fee, or forfeited entirely.

The main advantage of layaway is that no interest is charged. However, the seller will be reinvesting the payments into ventures (usually the business itself) with an ROI at or above the risk-free rate, which is effectively interest forfeited to the seller. In addition, the price is fixed, availability is guaranteed by reserving the item in stock, and an item being purchased as a gift can be kept secret. Consumers may also gain a sense of living within their means. However, consumers face potential financial loss in the case where a retailer declares bankruptcy prior to collecting the item.

== History ==
Layaway became common during the Great Depression of the 1930s. It was widely withdrawn during the 1980s, as the ubiquity of credit cards decreased its utility. Wal-Mart announced in September 2006 that it would discontinue layaway service in all its stores, citing the decrease in demand and a rise in cost of implementation. In September 2011, Wal-Mart resumed the service in the United States due to the new financial difficulties imposed by the economy and the increased constraints on consumer credit. During the 2012 season, many retailers were heavily advertising their layaway service and offering it for free (or effectively free) if all conditions were met. In contrast, Kmart has been providing layaway in the United States for over forty years, and was at one time the only major national discount retailer offering the service. Other large retailers offering layaway programs include Burlington Coat Factory, Marshalls, Sears, and T.J. Maxx. In Canada, it is available from many businesses including local bike shops, jewellers, and adventure holidays.

== Variations ==
Online layaway allows consumers to purchase items through scheduled deductions from a checking account. Online layaway simplifies layaway for both merchant and consumer by removing the costly, time-consuming storage and bookkeeping processes. Layaways remain at the distribution center during the layaway period instead of taking up valuable retail warehouse space. Just as consumers used layaway payment plans to purchase products at brick and mortar stores in the past, they can also use layaway to pay for online products and services which serves as an alternative budgeting tool and a means to avoid debt and it can help consumers reserve a product that is hard to get or not always available due its high demand and popularity.

Many stores offer layaway during the Christmas season, and it has been a tradition for some individuals to make holiday layaway donations, thus releasing the purchased items to the layaway participant.

Guaranteed consumer funding is a type of credit similar to layaway, which allows consumers to purchase items on a payment plan regardless of their credit history.

Music festivals may offer payment plans referred to as "layaway". Festivals with layaway plans include Ultra Music Festival and Electric Daisy Carnival.

== See also ==
- Credit
- Loan
- Retention of title – the buyer assumes possession but (legal) ownership is retained until a condition is fulfilled (usually settlement of outstanding payments)
