= Closed-end leasing =

Fixed-term lease with the option to buy at the end

Closed-end leasing is a contract-based system governed by law in the U.S. and Canada. It allows a person the use of property for a fixed term, and the right to buy that property for the agreed residual value when the term expires.

Closed-end leases are so called because they run for a fixed term, and the lessor and lessee agree in the lease contract what the residual value of the property being leased will be. In most cases (particularly in retail motor vehicle leases), the lessee has an option to purchase the property for the agreed residual value at the end of the lease term. Closed-end leases are not used for property which increases in value.

In most cases, when a closed-end lease is entered, the lessor does not already own the property being leased. Rather, the lessor agrees to purchase the property for a certain amount (the "capitalized cost") from a third party, such as a car dealer. The lessee will often be required to offer money up front as an offset against the capitalized cost (this is called the "capitalized cost reduction" although it is sometimes erroneously referred to as a "down payment"). The difference between the (adjusted) capitalized cost and the residual value is the depreciation component of the lease cost. In addition to depreciation, the lessee must also pay the lessor's cost of financing the purchase of the vehicle, which is referred to as "rent"; the rent also includes the lessor's profit.

The total lease cost can either be paid in a single lump sum, or amortized over the term of the lease with periodic (usually monthly) payments.

Closed-end leases generally provide that the lessee is responsible for insuring the property, for maintaining it in accordance with the lessor's requirements, and for paying any taxes or license fees which may be assessed on the lessor as owner of record. Open-ended(conventional) motor vehicle leases generally include a provision for determining the amount of "excess wear and tear" (or "wear and use") at the end of the lease term, for which the lessee is responsible upon returning the vehicle.

Closed-end leases have become very popular for automobile buyers in North America since the mid-1980s. Shield laws in most states allow lessors to avoid legal responsibility for the actions of their lessees, which has made it practical for automakers to offer leases direct to consumers without fear of "deep pockets" liability for injuries resulting from an accident. In those states which assess a use tax on vehicles, lessees need only pay tax on the amount of their lease payment, not on the entire value of their vehicle at the time of purchase. Finally, and most significantly, because lessees pay only for depreciation and financing, and not the entire retail cost of the vehicle, payments can be significantly lower than in loan-based financing. This allows consumers to significantly shorten their purchase cycle, increasing new-vehicle sales, which gives the automakers reason to emphasize leasing programs in their marketing.

Closed-end leases are not always the best choice for consumers. The finance companies which offer consumer car leases frequently require lessees to hold more costly insurance policies than would otherwise be necessary. Automakers often view leasing as a sales tool, and artificially inflate the lease-end residual value; this can make exercising the purchase option at the end of a lease more expensive than simply financing the vehicle over the longer term in the first instance. Finally, because of the increased financial risks undertaken by the lessor, higher credit quality is generally required to enter into a lease than to purchase a vehicle.

== See also ==
- Hire purchase
- Leasing
- Rent-to-own
- Vehicle leasing
