= Goods and services tax (Australia) =

Type of value added tax used in Australia

Quarterly GST tax revenues (in million AUD) since 2000

Goods and services tax (GST) in Australia is a value added tax of 10% on most goods and services sales, with some exemptions (such as for certain food, healthcare and housing items) and concessions (including qualifying long-term accommodation, which is taxed at an effective rate of 5.5%). GST is levied on most transactions in the production process, but is in many cases refunded to all parties in the chain of production other than the final consumer.

The tax was introduced by the Howard government and commenced on 1 July 2000, replacing the previous federal wholesale sales tax system and designed to phase out a number of various state and territory government taxes, duties and levies such as banking taxes and stamp duty.

A proposed increase of GST to 15% has been put forward, but is generally lacking in bipartisan support.

== Introduction of GST ==
Les Bury, federal treasurer in the Gorton government from 1969 to 1971, was an early supporter of a broad-based national consumption tax, believing that states needed a revenue source of their own without resorting to a reintroduction of state income tax. The idea of a broad-based consumption tax was again raised by federal treasurer Paul Keating at the 1985 Tax Summit, but was dropped at the behest of then Labor Prime Minister Bob Hawke after pressure from the ACTU, welfare groups and business, which did not like its association with proposals for capital gains and fringe benefits taxes.

The idea was revived in 1991 by the opposition Liberal-National Coalition led by John Hewson, and GST was the centrepiece of the opposition's "Fightback!" platform at the 1993 election. The opposition had difficulty explaining the policy, as exemplified by Hewson's famous Birthday Cake Interview, and Labor prime minister Paul Keating's campaign exploited public distrust of GST, which was considered a factor in the opposition's surprise loss of the "unloseable" 1993 election. In 1994, the Liberals decided to discard the remnants of "Fightback!" and Alexander Downer replaced Hewson as Liberal leader.

John Howard was re-elected leader of the Liberal party in 1995, and pledged "never, ever" to introduce GST. Howard led the Liberal-National Coalition to a large victory in the 1996 federal election. However, following a decision of the High Court that franchise fees charged by the states on cigarettes, alcohol and fuel was unconstitutional, removing revenue from the states and territories, Howard saw the need for the states to have autonomy on a portion of their revenue. Before the 1998 election, Howard proposed GST that would replace all existing sales taxes, as well as applying to all goods and services. At the election, the Howard government suffered a swing against it of 4.61% at the election, achieving a two-party-preferred vote of only 49.02%, compared with Labor on 50.98%. Nevertheless, the incumbent government retained a majority of seats in the lower house and Howard described the election win as a "mandate for GST". Lacking a Senate majority, and with Labor opposed to the introduction of GST, the government turned to the minor parties such as the Australian Democrats to gain the necessary support to get the necessary legislation through the Senate.

A prominent selling point of the legislation was that all the revenue raised by GST would be distributed to the states. In 1999, an agreement was reached with the state and territory governments that their various duties, levies and taxes on consumption would be removed over time, with the consequent budget shortfall being replaced by GST income distributed by the Commonwealth Grants Commission. Furthermore, federally levied personal income tax and company tax was reduced to offset GST.

During the 1998 election campaign, the leader of the Australian Democrats, Meg Lees, stated that her party was opposed to GST unless food, books and tourism packages sold offshore were exempt, and other compensating tax measures were implemented. The government initially stated that exemptions to GST were not possible, and looked most likely to pass the GST legislation with the support of independent Senator Brian Harradine but Harradine ultimately voted against the legislation. However a compromise was eventually reached with Lees, involving most basic food items being exempt from GST, the GST on library purchases of books being refunded, a temporary 8% refund on school textbooks, increases to welfare payments, and greater powers to the Australian Competition & Consumer Commission to oversee the implementation of the new tax regime. A proposal to exempt tampons from GST was dismissed by Howard. The legislation was passed on 28 June 1999 as A New Tax System (Goods and Services Tax) Act (Cth) 1999. It gained assent on 8 July 1999 and came into operation on 1 July 2000.

In October 2018, State and Federal Governments agreed to remove female hygiene products such as pads and tampons from the GST.

== Legal framework ==
All Australian businesses whose turnover is above the minimum threshold (currently $75,000 per annum) are required to register for GST. Businesses whose turnover is below the threshold may register if they wish to.

A GST-registered business must charge its customers GST on taxable goods and services it provides, but is entitled to a credit for any GST it has paid for its expenditures on these goods and services as well as capital purchases (called input tax credits). A registered business must periodically lodge Business Activity Statements (monthly, quarterly or annually), and at the same time pay the net amount of GST owed to the tax office (if more GST is paid than collected, a refund is paid by the tax office instead).

Some goods and services (notably salaries, wages, fresh food, and real estate) are exempt from GST. Other goods and services (rental income and financial services) are "input-taxed", which means that GST is not charged on the sale, but GST paid by that part of the business is not eligible to be claimed as an input tax credit.

Division 9 of the A New Tax System (Goods and Services Tax) Act 1999 (Cth) (GST Act) stipulates that GST is applicable to a supply of goods, services and transactions related to real property, obligations or rights. The supply must be for consideration (GST Act s9-15) to a relevant entity registered for GST (Div 23) in the course of enterprise (s9-20). This does not include employment or hobby income.

Products made entirely in Australia, as well as supplies going to or from Australia, are all taxable. Certain types of supplies are free of GST, examples include fresh unprocessed food, medical services, education courses, childcare, exports, pre-owned real estate and going concerns. When an enterprise purchases goods or services to be consumed or used for resupply to an end customer they may receive a refund (input tax credit) on the amount of GST contained in the price (Div 11), which means in effect no GST is paid on those supplies.

New residential and commercial properties are subject to GST but re-sale of existing properties is not. All real estate agent fees on either new or second-hand property are subject to GST. Processed foods such as biscuits, soft drinks, restaurant meals and take-away foods are also subject to GST.

Registered enterprises for GST must complete a Business Activity Statement (BAS) for reporting to the Australian Taxation Office on a monthly, quarterly, or annual basis (depending on revenue and main activity).

== Effects ==
=== Political consequences ===
John Howard had said that "GST would never become part of Liberal Party policy", but his change of heart would become apparent in the lead-up to the 1998 campaign. It was passed by the Senate in June 1999 in a heavily amended form. The Leader of the Democrats, Meg Lees, viewed the dilution of the GST legislation as a success, but the issue split the Democrats, with Senators Natasha Stott Despoja and Andrew Bartlett voting against GST. The move triggered infighting amongst the Democrats, and while the Democrats performed reasonably well in the 2001 federal election when Stott Despoja was party leader, the infighting worsened, resulting in Stott Despoja being forced out of the leadership and the loss, at the 2004 federal election, of the balance of power they once held in the Senate. The annihilation of the Democrats was completed at the following election in 2007 when they lost all their remaining seats, with the Australian Greens becoming the major third party.

Australian Labor Party leader Kim Beazley continued to oppose it during the Howard government's second term. During the 2001 election campaign, Labor made a 'GST rollback' a centrepiece of its election platform. Labor attempted to reprise the effects of the birthday cake interview by deriding the application of GST to cooked and uncooked chickens, but failed to ignite public response to the limited scope of the rollbacks applying only to gas and electricity bills. Labor lost the election, and though the September 11 attacks and the so-called Tampa affair dominated the campaign, the loss would effectively end all serious opposition to GST.

In early 2006, the New South Wales State Government and the Federal Treasurer Peter Costello launched adversarial advertising campaigns concerning distribution of GST revenues to the states. New South Wales treasurer Michael Costa argued in full-page newspaper advertisements and on televised commercials that New South Wales consumers paid $13 billion in GST but received only $10 billion back from the Commonwealth Grants Commission, and therefore New South Wales was subsidising resource rich states like Queensland and Western Australia. A bill was introduced that gave the federal government no obligation to hand back revenue earned by that state to be divided to other non-performing states. Unlike GST, sales tax revenue went back to the State that generated the sales tax.

The federal government counteracted with its own advertising campaign which claimed that New South Wales had breached its contractual obligations under the 1999 GST Agreement by continuing to charge unfair stamp duties and land taxes, which were supposed to have been abolished. After weeks of intense media and public pressure, the New South Wales State Government announced in its budget that it would reduce stamp duty and land tax, but critics argued that the State Government did not go far enough with much broader tax reform in New South Wales required to help encourage investment and business that had been forced elsewhere due to an unfavourable New South Wales business environment. This was in response to the Commonwealth allowing another $72 million in grants to New South Wales, in addition to existing annual increases.

In 2015, Mike Baird, Liberal premier of New South Wales at the time, supported calls for increasing the GST to 15%.

In 2016 Jay Weatherill, Labor Premier of South Australia, supported calls for increasing GST to 15%.

In 2017, Liberal Democratic Party Senator David Leyonhjelm proposed to remove the GST from electricity bills, arguing the change would reduce household power bills by 9% and slow inflation. The bill was rejected by the Turnbull government on the basis of the projected $2 billion reduction in GST distribution to state and territory governments, which he argued would be replaced by other taxes.

=== Economic and social effects ===
Critics have argued that the GST is a regressive tax, which has a more pronounced effect on lower income earners, meaning that the tax consumes a higher proportion of their income, compared to those earning large incomes. However, due to the corresponding reductions in personal income taxes, state banking taxes, federal wholesale taxes and some fuel taxes that were implemented when the GST was introduced, former treasurer Peter Costello claimed that people were effectively paying no extra tax. Others also point out that the more important question to ask is not whether GST is regressive, but whether GST is more regressive than the alternative indirect taxes, namely, sales, excise and turnover tax (not income tax because that is a direct tax). In addition, they argue that what affects poverty and fairness is not the burden of any particular tax, but the burden of the tax structure as a whole, and how tax revenues are redistributed. When GST is combined with progressive taxes, and the revenues distributed to the poor, the total fiscal structure can be progressive.

The preceding months before the GST became active saw a spike in consumption as consumers rushed to purchase goods that they perceived would be substantially more expensive with the GST. Once the tax came into effect, consumer consumption and economic growth declined such that by the first fiscal quarter of 2001, the Australian economy recorded negative economic growth for the first time in more than 10 years. Consumption soon returned to normal however. The Government was criticised by small business owners over the increased administrative responsibilities of submitting Business Activity Statements (BAS) on a quarterly basis to the Australian Taxation Office.

A study commissioned by the Curtin University of Technology, Perth in 2000 argued that the introduction of the GST would negatively affect the real estate market as it would add up to 8 percent to the cost of new homes and reduce demand by about 12 percent. The real estate market returned to boom between 2002 and 2004 where property prices and demand increased dramatically, particularly in Sydney and Melbourne. During the 2004–06 period Perth also witnessed a sharp climb in real estate prices and demand.

=== Tourist refund scheme ===
Before the introduction of the GST, goods could be purchased from suppliers offering duty-free pricing upon presentation of a current passport and airline tickets. The goods would then remain sealed until the passenger had passed through the customs area at an airport.

Following the introduction of the GST, a receipt for goods with a combined total over $300 is eligible for a refund of any GST paid upon exiting the country with refunds claimed at a TRS (Tourist Refund Scheme) counter at the airport. The advantage of this arrangement is that goods purchased 60 days prior to departure may be freely used within Australia prior departure as long as they are carried in hand luggage and presented when making a refund claim, or shown to customs officials before being checked in as baggage. This does not extend to consumable goods such as food and beverages, or any services such as plane tickets or hotel room charges. To claim the Tourist Refund Scheme you have to follow the given rules:

- You have to spend $300 or more including the GST on a single platform. You are allowed to combine all the invoices from the same retailer
- The goods that you bought must be available in your baggage or carry-on so they can be checked
- The original tax invoice of the good must be available. If there is a tax invoice that exceeds the amount of $1000 must have your name on it
- You should have paid for all the items yourself.

== See also ==
- Taxation in Australia
- Goods and Services Tax (Canada)
- Goods and Services Tax (Hong Kong)
- Goods and Services Tax (India)
- Goods and Services Tax (Malaysia)
- Goods and Services Tax (New Zealand)
- Goods and Services Tax (Singapore)
- Value Added Tax
- Value Added Tax (United Kingdom)
