= Everyday Loans =

British consumer finance company

- Trade name: Evlo (from March 2025)
- Type: Private
- Industry: Financial services
- Founded: 2006; 20 years ago
- Founder: Danny Malone
- Headquarters: Slough, Berkshire, England
- Area served: United Kingdom
- Key people: Jono Gillespie (CEO)
- Products: Unsecured personal loans
- Parent: Non-Standard Finance
- Website: evlo.co.uk

Everyday Loans (trading as Evlo since March 2025) is a British consumer finance company that provides unsecured personal loans to borrowers in the near-prime and sub-prime credit markets through a network of branches across the United Kingdom. Operated by Everyday Lending Limited, the company is authorised and regulated by the Financial Conduct Authority.

The company was acquired by Secure Trust Bank in 2012 and subsequently sold to Non-Standard Finance in 2016 for £235 million. Following NSF's financial difficulties, a scheme of arrangement in 2023 transferred the business to its secured creditors.

== History ==
Everyday Loans was founded in 2006 and acquired by Secure Trust Bank, a subsidiary of the Arbuthnot Banking Group, in 2012. By 2015, the company operated 36 branches with approximately 37,000 active customers.

In December 2015, Non-Standard Finance (NSF), a consumer finance company founded by former Provident Financial chief executive John van Kuffeler, agreed to acquire Everyday Loans Holdings Limited from Secure Trust Bank for an enterprise value of £235 million. The acquisition was funded through approximately £160 million in new equity and bank debt facilities, and was classified as a reverse takeover under the Listing Rules. The transaction completed on 13 April 2016.

By 2023, NSF faced mounting redress liabilities arising from complaints about unaffordable lending on loans issued before March 2021. In response, Everyday Lending Limited proposed a scheme of arrangement to address these liabilities, with £14 million set aside to satisfy borrower claims and fees owed to the Financial Ombudsman Service.

As part of the restructuring, NSF's operating businesses were transferred to a newly incorporated group owned by its secured lenders, who in exchange released £70 million of secured debt. Non-Standard Finance plc subsequently undertook an orderly wind-down, with shareholders receiving no recovery.

In March 2025, the company rebranded as Evlo.

== Business model and regulation ==
Everyday Loans operates in the UK non-prime consumer lending market, a sector that has contracted significantly since 2019 with the departure of major lenders including Wonga, Amigo Loans and Provident's doorstep lending division. The company uses a branch-based model requiring face-to-face meetings with borrowers, in contrast to the online-only approach of most competitors in the sector.

The company's representative APR is 99.9%. In 2024, the Advertising Standards Authority upheld a complaint against Everyday Loans, ruling that a television advertisement had presented a debt consolidation loan as "a convenient and inconsequential way of dealing with debt" without adequately communicating the risks to vulnerable borrowers.

The Financial Ombudsman Service has received significant volumes of complaints about loans issued by Everyday Lending Limited. Complaints about lending approved before March 2021 were addressed through the 2023 scheme of arrangement, while complaints about subsequent lending continue to be assessed individually.

== See also ==
- Non-Standard Finance
- Subprime lending
- Secure Trust Bank
