= Provident =

Provident may refer to:

- Entertainment
  - Provident Label Group, a music label
- Finance
  - Financial companies
    - Unum, formerly UnumProvident, formerly two separate companies Unum & Provident, a financial services company in the United States focusing on disability insurance
    - Friends Provident, a financial services company in the U.K. focusing on life assurance
    - PNC Financial Services, formerly known as Provident National Bank
    - Provident Financial plc, a financial group based in Bradford, England focusing on the home lending and insurance markets
    - Provident, a Hungarian subsidiary of International Personal Finance
  - Retirement plans
    - Central Provident Fund, Singapore's retirement plan
    - Public Provident Fund, India's retirement plan
    - Mandatory Provident Fund, Hong Kong's retirement plan
- Recreation
  - Provident Skate Park in Visalia, California
