= Subprime lending =

Loans to people with higher credit risk

In finance, subprime lending (also referred to as near-prime, subpar, non-prime, and second-chance lending) is the provision of loans to people who may have difficulty maintaining the repayment schedule.

Subprime loans are characterized by higher interest rates, poor quality collateral, and less favorable terms in order to compensate for higher credit risk. During the early to mid-2000s, many subprime loans were packaged into mortgage-backed securities (MBS) and ultimately defaulted, contributing to the 2008 financial crisis.

Proponents of subprime lending maintain that the practice extends credit to people who would otherwise not have access to the credit market. Professor Harvey S. Rosen of Princeton University explained, "The main thing that innovations in the mortgage market have done over the past 30 years is to let in the excluded: the young, the discriminated against, the people without a lot of money in the bank to use for a down payment."

== Defining subprime risk ==
The term subprime refers to the credit quality of particular borrowers, who have weakened credit histories and a greater risk of loan default than prime borrowers. As people become economically active, records are created relating to their borrowing, earning, and lending histories. This is called a credit rating; although covered by privacy laws, the information is readily available to people with a need to know (in some countries, loan applications specifically allow the lender to access such records). Subprime borrowers have credit ratings that might include:

- limited or no debt experience;
- limited or no possession of property assets that could be used as security (for the lender to sell in case of default);
- excessive debt;
- the known income of the individual or family is unlikely to be enough to pay living expenses, plus interest and repayment;
- a history of late or sometimes missed payments;
- failures to pay debts completely (default debt);
- legal judgments such as "orders to pay" or bankruptcy (sometimes known in Britain as County Court judgments or CCJs).

Lenders' standards for determining risk categories may also consider the size of the proposed loan and the way the loan and its repayment plan are structured: conventional repayment loan, mortgage loan, endowment mortgage, interest-only loan, standard repayment loan, amortized loan, credit card limit, or some other arrangement. The originator is also taken into consideration. Because of this, it was possible for a loan made to a borrower with "prime" characteristics (e.g. high credit score, low debt) to be classified as subprime.

== By country ==
=== United States ===
Although there is no single, standard definition, in the United States subprime loans are usually classified as those where the borrower has a FICO score below 600. The term was popularized by the media during the subprime mortgage crisis or "credit crunch" of 2007. Those loans which do not meet Fannie Mae or Freddie Mac underwriting guidelines for prime mortgages are called "non-conforming" loans. As such, they cannot be packaged into Fannie Mae or Freddie Mac MBS and have less secondary market liquidity.

A borrower with a history of always making repayments on time and in full will get what is called an A grade paper loan. Borrowers with less-than-perfect credit scores might be rated as meriting an A-minus, B-paper, C-paper or D-paper loan, with interest payments progressively increased for less reliable payers to allow the company to share the risk of default equitably among all its borrowers. Between A-paper and subprime in risk is a grade called Alt-A. A-minus is related to Alt-A, with some lenders categorizing them the same, but A-minus is traditionally defined as mortgage borrowers with a FICO score of below 660 while Alt-A is traditionally defined as loans lacking full documentation or with alternative documentation of ability to repay . The value of U.S. subprime mortgages was estimated at $1.3 trillion (~$1.94 trillion in 2025) as of March 2007, with over 7.5 million first-lien subprime mortgages outstanding.

==== Student loans ====
In the United States the amount of student loan debt surpassed credit card debt, hitting the trillion dollar mark in 2012. However, that $1 trillion rapidly grew by 50% to $1.5 trillion as of 2018. In other countries such loans are underwritten by governments or sponsors. Many student loans are structured in special ways because of the difficulty of predicting students' future earnings. These structures may be in the form of soft loans, income-sensitive repayment loans, income-contingent repayment loans and so on. Because student loans provide repayment records for credit rating, and may also indicate their earning potential, student loan default can cause serious problems later in life as an individual wishes to make a substantial purchase on credit such as purchasing a vehicle or buying a house, since defaulters are likely to be classified as subprime, which means the loan may be refused or more difficult to arrange and certainly more expensive than for someone with a perfect repayment record.

=== Canada ===
The sub-prime market did not take hold in Canada to the extent that it did in the United States.

=== United Kingdom ===
In the United Kingdom, the term "subprime" is less commonly used than in the United States; the sector is more often described as "non-prime", "non-standard" or "sub-prime" lending and encompasses a broader range of unsecured consumer credit rather than being primarily mortgage-focused. Major product categories include high-cost short-term credit (payday loans), home-collected credit (doorstep lending), guarantor loans, sub-prime credit cards, branch-based instalment loans, logbook loans and rent-to-own.

Regulation of consumer credit in the UK transferred from the Office of Fair Trading to the Financial Conduct Authority (FCA) in April 2014. The FCA introduced a price cap on high-cost short-term credit in January 2015, limiting charges to 0.8% per day of the amount borrowed and ensuring borrowers could never repay more than double the original loan. The cap contributed to the collapse of Wonga, formerly the UK's largest payday lender, which entered administration in August 2018. Broader FCA interventions between 2019 and 2023 targeted other high-cost segments including overdraft pricing, home-collected credit and guarantor lending, leading to further market exits across the sector.

The overall effect of regulatory reform was a significant contraction of the UK non-prime market. By 2024, the FCA reported that the high-cost credit sector had shrunk by almost £3 billion of lending since 2019, with more than 250 firms exiting the market. Major lender departures included Wonga (payday, 2018), BrightHouse (rent-to-own, 2020), Amigo Loans (guarantor lending, 2023) and Provident's doorstep lending division (home-collected credit, 2021), while instalment lenders such as Everyday Loans continued to operate in the branch-based segment. A 2024 report by ClearScore and EY described the resulting non-prime lending market as "broken", noting that vulnerable consumers were being pushed towards unregulated buy now, pay later products or illegal money lenders, with an estimated three million adults having used an unlicensed lender in the preceding three years — a tenfold increase from earlier FCA estimates.

Academic research has characterised the UK experience as an example of market failure in sub-prime credit, arguing that regulatory intervention reduced exploitative lending but simultaneously created diseconomies of small scale that discouraged new market entry, leaving a gap that neither credit unions nor community development finance institutions have been able to fill at sufficient scale.

== Subprime crisis ==
The subprime mortgage crisis arose from "bundling" American subprime and American regular mortgages into mortgage-backed securities (MBSs) that were traditionally isolated from, and sold in a separate market from, prime loans. These "bundles" of mixed (prime and subprime) mortgages were based on asset-backed securities so the probable rate of return looked very good (since subprime lenders pay higher premiums on loans secured against saleable real-estate, which was commonly assumed "could not fail"). Many subprime mortgages had a low initial interest rate for the first two or three years and those who defaulted were 'swapped' regularly at first, but finally, a bigger share of borrowers began to default in staggering numbers. The inflated house-price bubble burst, property valuations plummeted and the real rate of return on investment could not be estimated, and so confidence in these instruments collapsed, and all less-than-prime mortgages were considered to be almost worthless toxic assets, regardless of their actual composition or performance. Because of the "originate-to-distribute" model followed by many subprime mortgage originators, there was little monitoring of credit quality and little effort at remediation when these mortgages became troubled. Markets with a high concentration of aggressive lending facilities are at risk of a sharper fall in real estate prices after a negative shock to demand.

To avoid high initial mortgage payments, many subprime borrowers took out adjustable-rate mortgages (or ARMs) that give them a lower initial interest rate. But with potential annual adjustments of 4% or more per year, these loans could end up costing much more. Under a typical subprime mortgage made during the housing boom, a $500,000 loan at a 5.5% interest rate for 30 years results in a monthly principal and interest payment of approximately $2,839.43. In contrast, the same loan at 8.5%, under a typical 3% adjustment cap for 27 years (after the adjustable period ends), results in a payment of about $4,079.74. The following adjustment (typically 1% every six months) would result in an increase of approximately 42.5% from the initial monthly payment.

This is even more apparent when the lifetime cost of the loan is considered (though most people will want to refinance their loans periodically). The total cost of the above loan at 5.5% is approximately $1,018,891.24, while the higher rate of 9.5% would incur a lifetime cost of approximately $1,366,390.93.

== See also ==
- Amortization (business)
- Collateral (finance)
- Endowment mortgage
- Graduated payments
- Microcredit
- Mortgage loan
- Soft loan
