= Sunset Overdrive =

2014 video game

- Developer: Insomniac Games (Note: Blind Squirrel Games developed the Windows port.)
- Publisher: Microsoft Studios
- Directors: Marcus Smith; Drew Murray
- Producer: Bryan Intihar
- Designer: Cameron Christian
- Programmer: Doug Sheahen
- Artist: Jacinda Chew
- Writers: Jon Paquette; Gerry Duggan
- Composer: Boris Salchow
- Platforms: Xbox One; Windows
- Release: Xbox One: NA: October 28, 2014; AU: October 30, 2014; EU: October 31, 2014; Windows: WW: November 16, 2018
- Genres: Action-adventure, third-person shooter
- Modes: Single-player, multiplayer (Note: Only the Xbox One version has multiplayer.)

Sunset Overdrive is a 2014 action-adventure video game developed by Insomniac Games and published by Microsoft Studios. It is set in a fictional metropolis called Sunset City, where the company FizzCo has launched a new energy drink which has turned the people who drank it into mutants known as Overcharge Drinkers. The player controls an employee of FizzCo, who gets trapped in Sunset City when it is quarantined, and must fight off the OD while helping other humans trapped inside. Along with a large arsenal of weapons, the player can wall-run, ride zip-lines, and grind rails to swiftly navigate through the city, with evasion of enemy attacks reliant on maintaining momentum rather than a cover system. The game also has a cooperative multiplayer mode called Chaos Squad, which tasks players to complete a series of missions with seven players.

The development of Sunset Overdrive began in 2011 when Insomniac completed Resistance 3. After the project was green-lit internally, the studio partnered with Microsoft Studios, which helped fund the game and allowed Insomniac to keep the rights to the franchise. Insomniac described the game as a "celebration of games", as the team took inspiration from different sources, including Prince of Persia, Jet Set Radio and Tony Hawk's Pro Skater, though at its early stage of development the team took inspirations from DayZ instead. The game is set in a post-apocalyptic future, but the team depicted it as an "awesomepocalypse" that turns the game's initial world depiction into a "playground" for players. The game uses Insomniac's internal engine, previously used in Fuse.

Sunset Overdrive was announced at E3 2013, and released worldwide for Xbox One in October 2014. A Windows version, developed by Blind Squirrel Games, was released in November 2018. The game received generally positive reviews from critics, who praised its visuals, traversal system, combat system, and humor. However, the game was criticized for the lack of a compelling story or innovative quest design. It sold about 1.9 million units, barely generating any profit for Insomniac Games. It received numerous nominations, including Best Xbox Game of the Year awards from several gaming publications. The game was supported with multiple pieces of downloadable content, including the story-based The Mystery of the Mooil Rig and Dawn of the Rise of the Fallen Machine, after the game's release.

== Gameplay ==
In Sunset Overdrive, players can grind rails to navigate the game's world. The game's world, Sunset City, is portrayed with vibrant colors.

Sunset Overdrive is an action-adventure game set in a third-person perspective. Players navigate a metropolis called Sunset City in the year 2027. This dystopian world has been overrun by mutants called the OD, short for Overcharge Drinkers. The player character is a former FizzCo employee, tasked with cleaning up the mess left behind from a party FizzCo had thrown to celebrate the launch of its new energy drink, Overcharge Delirium XT.

At the start of the game, players can customize the protagonist's sex, body type, hairstyle, and outfit using the character creator. Players may also alter the look of their customized character at any point during the game by approaching a vendor named Callista. After creating their characters, players proceed to the game's open world, which is free for players to explore at any time. A fast travel system is provided allowing players to reach different locations and to navigate the world quickly. The game features a main campaign with story elements and side-missions, which are triggered automatically when players enter certain locations in the city. These quests mainly involve players delivering objects to other non-playable characters and collecting items from the world. Some of these quests have time limits.

The game's combat focuses on velocity, and encourages players to defeat enemies in a fast-paced way. As a result, players can employ different moves including wall running, air-dashing, zip lining, performing parkour, acrobatics, and water traversal. Players use grind rails to deftly navigate city streets, and are able to switch direction instantly at will. The city is also filled with items for players to bounce up into the air. Players may utilize their weapons while performing these movements and slow down time for players to take aim. On-foot, players cannot walk, take cover, or take out enemies silently, but instead must rely on agility to survive as they will be overwhelmed quickly by enemies if they choose to walk on the ground. The game also features a Style Meter. Shown in the head-up display (HUD) of the game, the Meter increases as players perform stylish moves like killing enemies and grinding on-rails without touching the ground. When players are killed, they do not have to wait for the game to load. Players can respawn and return to the world by different methods, such as descending with a rocket or exiting a golden sarcophagus. Insomniac named this system "Next-Gen Respawning".

Throughout the game, players encounter both human enemies, such as gang members, FizzCo's robots, OD'd humans who have mutated from drinking too much of the energy drink, and several bosses who are more difficult to defeat compared with other ordinary enemies. The game features a variety of weapons for players to use to combat enemies. These include the standard assault rifle AK-FU and the TNTeddy grenade launcher, which fires teddy bears strapped to sticks of dynamite, fireworks and toy helicopters. All weapons eventually run out of ammunition but do not need to be reloaded while being used. Different weapons are effective against different enemies, and players unlock more weapons by progressing through the story or purchasing them from shops. Weapons can be upgraded and modified by applying "Amps", which increases weapons' lethality, efficiency, and strength, though some amps are only activated when the player reached a certain style level. The weapons can be leveled up when players earn enough experience points or defeat enough enemies with them. In addition, players gained different badges throughout the game for completing actions such as grinding and killing enemies. These badges can be used to purchased Overdrives which grant players additional passive skills such as increasing the damage or ammo capacity of a certain type of weapon.

The game features an eight-player co-operative multiplayer mode called the Chaos Squad, which tasks players to complete a series of missions, as decided by the players themselves. Players defend vats of Overcharge Delirium XT from waves of OD'd at night and stop their progression by setting up fortifications and barriers, in a manner similar to tower defense games. It is inter-connected with the single-player mode allowing players to transfer their story character, with all the weapons and gadgets they have already accumulated, to the mode. Although players work together, players also try to earn more Style points during play than their co-op partners.

== Plot ==
On July 13, 2027, megaconglomerate FizzCo hosts a massive pre-release party in Sunset City for its new energy drink, OverCharge Delirium XT (also known as OverCharge), allowing the citizens to be the first to try it. In an attempt to sell OverCharge faster, FizzCo skipped health regulation protocols and rushed through testing, leading to the drink being so toxic that anyone who drinks it transforms into a violent, boil-covered mutant known as an Overcharge Drinker (OD). The mutants infest the city within hours of the pre-release party, which comes to be known as "Horror Night". In order to cover up the deception, FizzCo claims that a viral outbreak has happened and quarantines the whole city, preventing anyone from entering or exiting. The player, a janitor employed by FizzCo, is saved from an attacking OD by Walter, a former FizzCo security guard. Walter admits him into a small group of fellow survivors, which also includes Floyd, a former FizzCo chemist whose concerns about OverCharge's safety went unheeded.

To help Walter build a makeshift helicopter to escape the city and reveal the truth about the outbreak, the player goes out looking for a propeller, and rescues nerdy college student Sam in the process. Once the player and Sam enlist the help of Sam's rich and lazy Oxford West classmates, they 3D print him a propeller. The player joins Walter in the helicopter to escape the city, but at the last second, Walter notices an invisible wall and rescues the player by pushing them out of the helicopter, sacrificing himself in the process.

Floyd tells the player about a friend of Walter's named Bryllcream, who is the scout leader of Troop Bushido and can likely help them figure out another escape plan. The player visits the troop's hideout in a Japanese samurai museum, where their interim scout leader Norton claims he hasn't been able to find Bryllcream. However, the player teams up with an exiled trooper named 4Kim to rescue Bryllcream from the back of a garbage truck (having been trapped inside by Norton for nearly three weeks since Horror Night, Bryllcream had to eat all four of his own limbs to survive). The three of them return to the Japanese museum to confront Norton and, in a last-ditch effort to retain leadership of the troop, he chugs a can of OverCharge that turns him into a dragon. The player then slays Norton to rescue Bryllcream.

Bryllcream refers the player to Ignatius, an engineer and passionate larper who can likely build them a boat to escape. Despite Ignatius and almost everyone in his LARP club "Fargarthia" being under the panic-induced delusion that their medieval role-play is real, Ignatius is able to design them a boat that, by being made of garbage, would trick the wall's sensors into letting them through. The player and Wendy, the only non-delusional member of the LARP club, make it past the invisible wall – however, FizzCo robots enter the city to try to kill all the witnesses inside (including the Oxfords and Troop Bushido), and when Sam calls the player to plea for help, the player feels compelled to go back to the city and rescue his friends.

After being rescued, Sam suggests that they try to infiltrate FizzCo headquarters in search of evidence, an escape route, and/or a rumored superweapon inside the building. He elaborates that the only people who managed to infiltrate the building are Las Catrinas, a band of La Calavera Catrina-themed Mexican American cheerleaders who rigorously defend the children's ward of a local hospital. Though they are standoffish towards the player at first, the player wins them over by organizing a concert for the children headlined by King Buzzo (voiced and mocapped by the real Melvins singer).

The player rallies the four factions to attack FizzCo headquarters, and attempts to destroy FizzCo HQ by riding a giant bottle of OverCharge into it. The player is killed in the blast, and the factions mourn them. However, the player breaks the fourth wall by pausing the credits rolling after this scene to complain about how depressing the ending is, and decides to change it. The player survives and gets respawned, and it is revealed that the superweapon is the FizzCo building itself, which turns into a giant robot and tries to destroy the city (erasing all evidence of the OverCharge outbreak). The player destroys the robot and has milk and crackers with the other survivors (forgoing alcohol because most of Troop Bushido is underage). After the credits, however, computers in the FizzCo headquarters automatically activate a protocol sending FizzCo helicopters full of OverCharge around the world, foreshadowing an international OD outbreak.

== Development ==
=== Origin ===
Sunset Overdrive was developed by Insomniac Games, which had mainly developed games for PlayStation consoles. Drew Murray and Marcus Smith, the game's creative directors, began brainstorming Sunset Overdrive after the completion of Resistance 3 in 2011. They presented their ideas to Insomniac's owners and CEO Ted Price, outlining a project that would borrow influences from the documentary Hyena Men of Kenya, Tank Girl comics, the novel I Am Legend, the British television series The Young Ones, Halloween masks from the 1960s, and Lego. The initial presentation failed to generate interest, but Murray and Smith were asked to come back a week later to explain how the game would actually be played. In their second presentation, they explained their vision of a game featuring fast-paced action that would be "the rock and roll end times". According to Smith, this confused some team members who thought that they were making Brütal Legend.

The team received approval after their second presentation. After Sunset Overdrive was green-lit internally, Insomniac had to pitch it to a number of publishers. Insomniac wanted to retain brand ownership, causing some firms to opt-out of publishing it. Murray and Smith traveled to Microsoft Studios a number of times to pitch the game to them. The main pitch began with the playing of "Kick Out the Jams" by MC5, and ended with Murray: "...on top of a chair, mimicking how the game was going to play, and the last-minute heroics." Microsoft was eager to work with Insomniac and agreed to fund and publish the game. The team originally did not want to make it a console exclusive, but they were impressed by Microsoft's philosophy toward the development of Xbox One, and the capabilities of Xbox Live features, which allow the initiation of a "two-way dialogue" with players.

=== Design ===
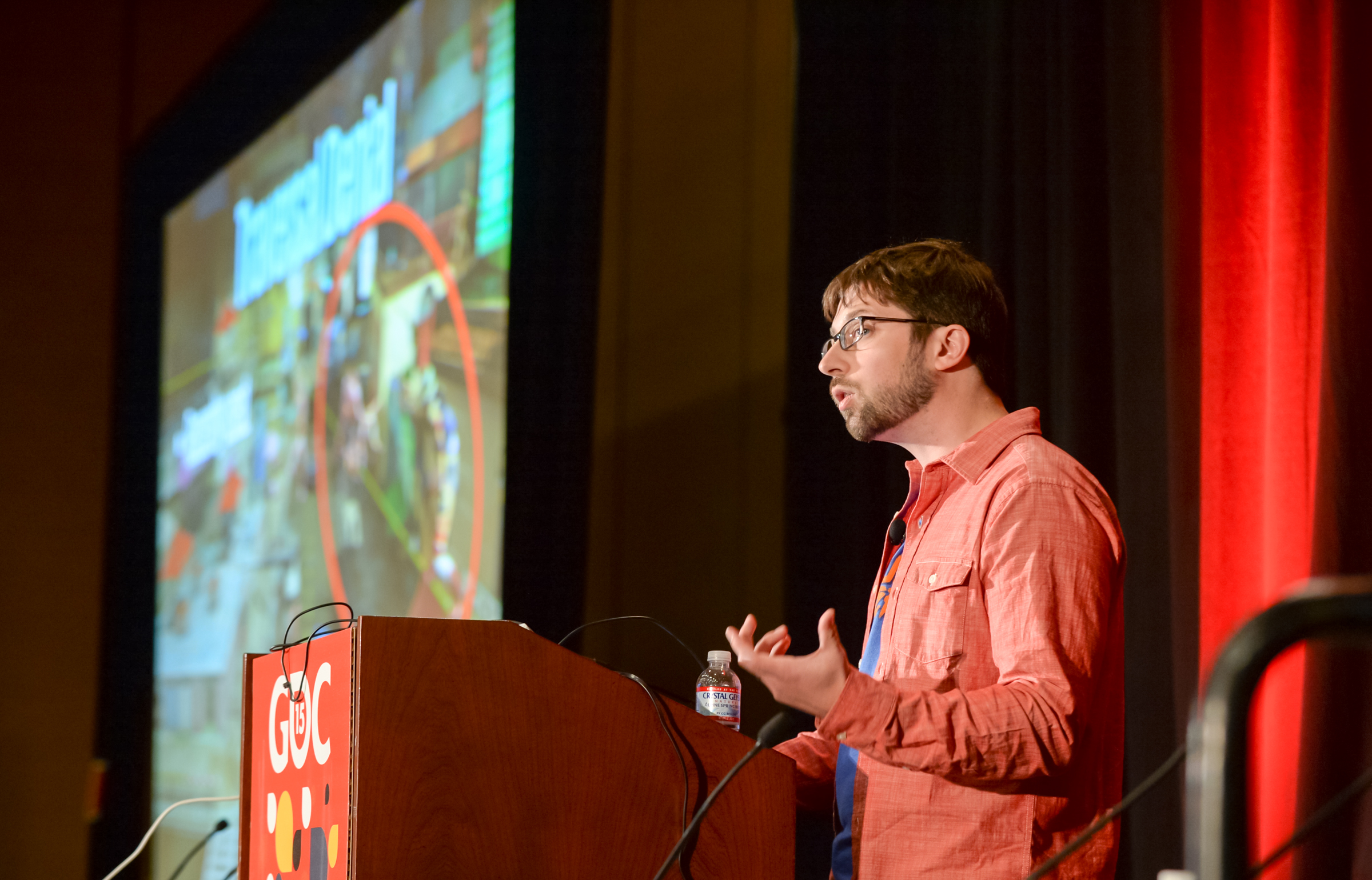
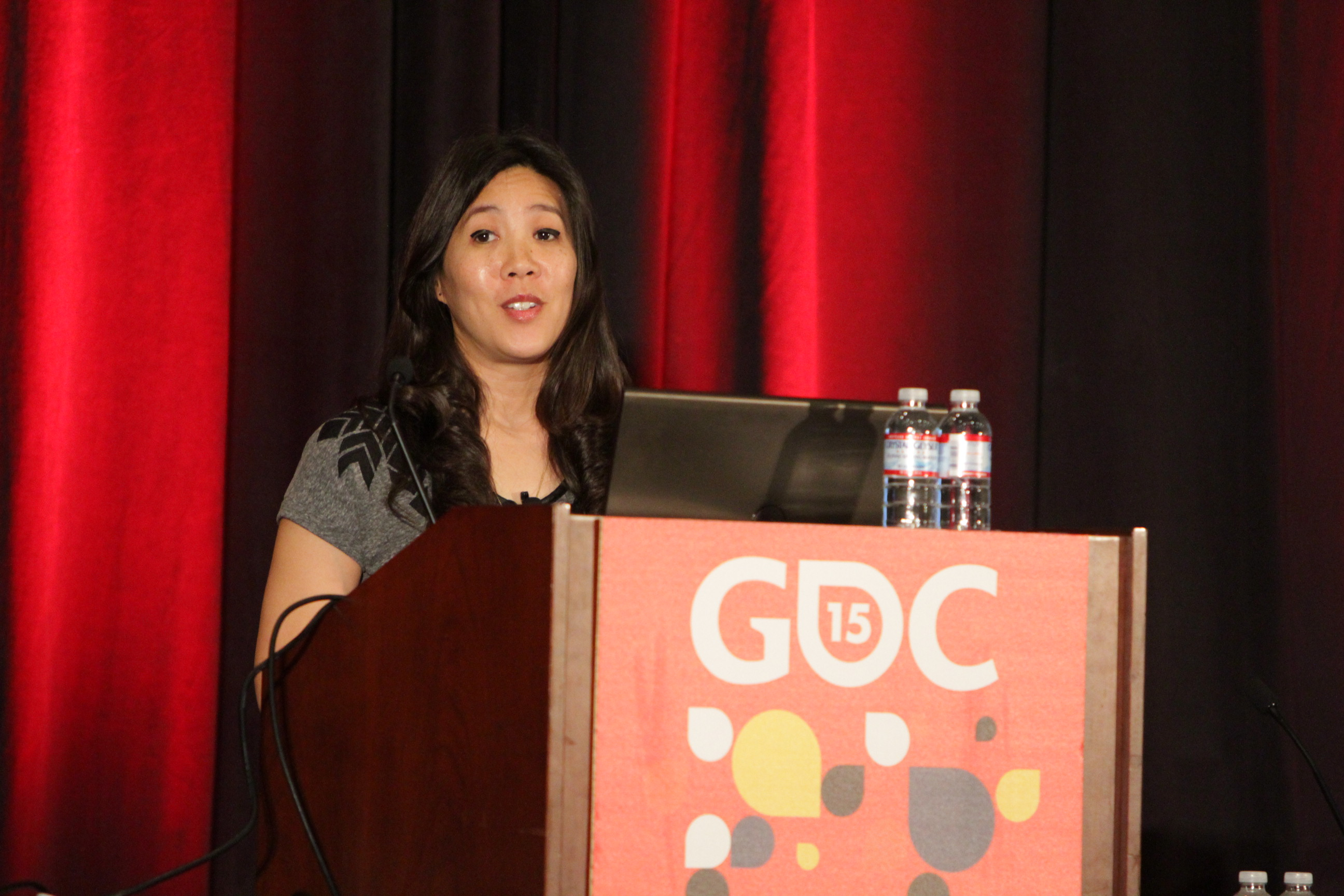
Gameplay programmer Adam Noonchester and art director Jacinda Chew present on the game's development at GDC 2015

Choosing a name for the game was the first thing the team did before starting development. They decided on the name Sunset Overdrive because they felt it was unique, and captured the feeling of the "grindhouse" from the 1970s. The project was originally conceived as an open world survival game similar to DayZ. The initial version of the game did not feature the traversal system, nor the unusual weapons included in the final version, and was described as "grounded" by Murray. In this version, players were tasked with scavenging resources during daytime, and defending their base at night. This later evolved to become the game's cooperative multiplayer mode. It employed the animation model from Insomniac's previous game, Fuse. The direction of the game changed after the team watched the music video for "On Melancholy Hill" by Gorillaz, and Murray gave up the idea of a realistic survival game. He then asked the team to start prototyping ideas for a game that they thought would work. Some team members came up with the idea of having skateboarding elements in the game, which led the development team to start working and experimenting with a new traversal system. In hindsight, Murray described the shift in focus as an "organic, evolutionary process". As the game's development progressed, the team began to draw on elements from other video game franchises such as Prince of Persia, Jet Set Radio, and Tony Hawk's Pro Skater, and put the emphasis on momentum.

In 2013, the team had released Fuse, which was a critical and commercial failure. The team now reflected on the reasons for its poor reception, and felt that they should go back to Insomniac's roots — developing unusual titles with vibrant visuals — instead of another dark shooter like Fuse. They also thought that Sunset Overdrive's stylization should reflect the personality of the company, and that building a world that has a sense of humor and irreverence was something the team was eager to do. Ted Price, CEO of Insomniac Games, described it as a game Insomniac had wanted to develop for a long time. The game's producer, Bryan Intihar, called it: "...the game [they've] been meaning to make for 20 years." Microsoft supported it and shared the same vision and the idea of creating something new.

According to Price, Insomniac wanted to "break the rules of shooters". He felt that the last generation of shooters had established a formula of staying behind cover for defense, and leaning out from it to attack. He wanted to change that pattern with Sunset Overdrive by encouraging players to attack in an aggressive manner and to focus on momentum. To accomplish this, the team developed a city that supported parkour and fast movements. They also hoped that with the introduction of a new generation of video game consoles, they could establish a new standard for the genre which would "retrain" shooter fans playing the game.

Smith compared Sunset Overdrive's gameplay to pinball games, where a player's every movement has consequences, and the on-screen chaos created by players is based on their actions. The game's combat and traversal elements were originally separate from each other, but were later connected as the team began to think that: "shooting while grinding was fun". The combination of these aspects led the studio to adjust the game's world design. The team calculated how the city should be designed so that it could support both combat and traversal. As a result, they ensured that the world was built in modular 4x4 blocks and that no surface featured an angle that was between 26 and 45 degrees. Furthermore, the team considered how long grinds should be and decided that they should be at least 8 meters in length. The grinds were designed to be longer than usual in enemy-concentrated areas so as to allow additional time for players to consider both combat and traversal options. In order to encourage experimentation, the game features a vertical map-design, in which the difficulty of enemies increases as players move towards higher ground.

Insomniac described the game as "a celebration of games", in which the team pushed existing concepts in a new direction. Besides drawing influences from Prince of Persia, Tony Hawk's Pro Skater and Jet Set Radio series of games for the game's traversal system, they drew influences from Bill & Ted's Excellent Adventure for their "Next-Gen Respawn" system, Scott Pilgrim and The Omega Man for the game's setting, and Peggle when they were creating the game's weaponry. The game's humor was inspired by Insomniac's own game series Ratchet & Clank and Spyro the Dragon. There are also references to other pop culture icons such as Breaking Bad and Portal. Despite that, Smith said that the game would be completely different from The Last of Us.

The game's character creator function allowed players to create different kinds of combinations in an avatar. The team ensured that there were many customization options, including allowing players to "dress like a crazy person". The developers felt that this feature would suit the story, because the game's city enters a state of anarchy, where social norms no longer exist. The team wanted the character creator to feature diversity, so that players could build an avatar based on their own choices. They found the process of introducing diversity challenging. As a result, a system was developed that broke the character creator down into three different categories: mainstream, street (emo and goth), and costume. The team originally added role-playing games-styled stats to the game's costumes, but later decided to scrap that so that players "would just choose what they thought looked cool."

=== Art and setting ===
When we got off of Resistance 3, which is a very dark, dystopian world, but right for that game, we said, 'Let's do something fun. [...] OK, let's create a character whose life is shitty in the modern world. And when the apocalypse comes, it's like a dream come true.

— John Paquette, the game's lead writer

The game is set in a near-future, post-apocalyptic world. The team wanted to try something different, unwilling to return to a setting that was similar to Resistance 3. Instead of depicting a world with a dark atmosphere and gritty environments, the catastrophe that occurs in the game's story line is referred to as an "awesomepocalypse” that transforms the user's initial view of the game's world as a "playground" for players to explore and do whatever they want – "emphasizing the fun of free reign [sic] during end times." The goal was to make players feel that the post-apocalyptic world in Sunset Overdrive is fun and limitless, delighting and lively, instead of a place that is dreadful and worrying. To achieve this, vibrant and vivid colors were used to create the game's world and the team hoped that by tweaking the nature of the setting, the game would be "self-aware, humorous, and fun". The team also intentionally avoided creating a very serious tone because the final product needed to be entertaining and comparable to games like Crazy Taxi and Jet Grind Radio, instead of something too serious that looked like an interactive movie. The team emphasized "fun trumps realism" and reflected that through the "Next-gen Respawn" system, unrealistic weaponry, and the game's visual style.

While the game features colorful graphics that appeal to a broad audience, it was intended for a mature audience which is reflected in the game's story, dialogue, and characters' portrayals. The story was designed to be casual, but compelling. The game's setting is inspired by both I Am Legend and imagining Iggy Pop as the last person surviving in a post-apocalyptic world. The team also wanted to create a satirical story, and explore the theme of anti-corporatism. The punk rock style was implemented in the game because the game's directors thought that it reflected a sense of "aggression", which suited the gameplay.

When designing the cover art, the team collaborated with the English studio Ilovedust. They wanted it to be easily recognized and stand out from the cover art of other video games in stores. They also wanted it to represent the game's characteristics: "intensity", "fun in the end times" in a "dynamic and vibrant world". There were three different iterations of the cover art, with major changes made to the game's protagonist throughout its development, as the studio struggled with the protagonist's portrayal. Insomniac was ultimately satisfied with Ilovedust's finished art design.

=== Technology ===
Price called Sunset Overdrive the biggest game the studio had worked on. As it was the first open world game developed by Insomniac they had to deploy new design and development skills to produce it. The time and resources needed to develop the game also expanded significantly. While developing the game's world, the team broke it down into 10 to 11 hexes and zones. They are classified into three different types: low resolution zones, shadow zones, and mission zones, and they overlap each other so that they can keep all zones loaded at the same time. Sunset City had three different iterations. In the early stages, it was called Greenlight City, based on Burbank, California. This version of the city featured interior structures that could be explored by players, and existed when the game's core concept revolved around "scavenge, craft, defend". This city was replaced with "Razor City" when skateboarding, which later became oil slicks and trampolines, was introduced to the game. Razor City was "Neo-Tokyo"-styled, but was later replaced by Sunset City which was more organized. While designing the game's artificial intelligence, the team thought that the game's enemies must force players to use the traversal system while simultaneously engaging in combat with them. Because of the game's vertical design, the enemies were designed to adopt the game's vertical map-design. The team also developed a “nav position tracker”, which programmed these enemies to detect the location of players and find an ambush point.

The game is powered by an internal engine developed previously by Insomniac Games for its game Fuse. The engine of the game was reworked and optimized for the Xbox One. The game runs on 900p at 30 frames per second. The game originally ran at a higher definition of 1080p, but it was decided to fix it at 900p so that more actions and enemies can appear on-screen.

=== Audio ===
Development of the game's music was led by Boris Salchow, who had composed scores for Insomniac's previous games Ratchet & Clank: A Crack In Time, Resistance 2 and Resistance 3. He collaborated with composers from Microsoft Studios, and Pyramind music studio. The design team wanted the composers to implement eight different styles of music for eight different sections featured in the game. However, this idea was dropped as being confusing and overly-chaotic. The team wanted to achieve a "high energy vibe" for this title and the resulting soundtrack features a lot of punk rock and electronic dance music. Fourteen different bands and artists were hired to perform the music often avoiding using musical instruments and writing lyrics for the game instead. The game's soundtrack was also inspired by works from FIDLAR, DZ Deathrays and Ty Segall.

Composers tried to match beats-per-minute to the gameplay and traversal system. The game features a dynamic music system, in which in-game actions are reflected by the music. When there is more on-screen action, or when players perform kills, the music becomes more frantic and exciting to help players further immerse themselves in the game.

== Release ==
Sunset Overdrive was one of the first Xbox One exclusives revealed at Microsoft's press conference at E3 2013. The first gameplay details were revealed by gaming magazine Edge in May 2014. A gameplay demo and a release date announcement happened at E3 2014. Insomniac had worked solely for the PlayStation family for about twenty years, and the announcement of Sunset Overdrive being an Xbox exclusive led to speculation that the relationship between Sony and Insomniac had ended. Insomniac denied such rumors, saying the company would still be working with other publishers to produce titles and that petitions would not change Sunset Overdrive's status as an Xbox exclusive. It was released on October 28, 2014. On November 15, 2018, it was announced that the title would be released for both Windows 10 and Steam on November 16, 2018, without the multiplayer component. THQ Nordic published the game's retail version while Microsoft retained its digital publishing rights.

In addition to the game's standard edition, players can purchase the game's Season Pass, which adds new in-game items, locations, quests, and bosses. There is also a Day One Edition, which includes three different downloadable content items: "Nothin' but the Hits" gun, the Hardcore Hammer, and a Fizzie costume. Players who pre-ordered the game from Xbox Live Marketplace also got two additional weapons: the Accordes de la Muerte and the Hangover. A white Xbox One bundle was also released for the game. To promote the game, Insomniac organized a series of shows called the Sunset TV. They provided new information to players regarding the game prior to its release. Microsoft also launched a website called Sunset Overdrive: Walter's Workshop, which is a browser game that allows players to use some of the weapons featured in the game with footage captured in real-life.

A three-hour free trial of the game was available for players to download for a limited time. Once it was launched the game was supported with downloadable content (DLC). Insomniac released multiple packs which add new weapons to the game. A story-based DLC, titled The Mystery of the Mooil Rig, was released on December 23, 2014. Another story DLC, Dawn of the Rise of the Fallen Machine, was released on April 1, 2015.

== Reception ==
=== Critical reception ===
Reception

Aggregate score
Aggregator	Score
Metacritic	(PC) 83/100 (XONE) 81/100

Review scores
Publication	Score
Destructoid	8.5/10
Electronic Gaming Monthly	9/10
Game Informer	9.25/10
GameRevolution	5/5
GameSpot	8/10
GamesRadar+	4/5
IGN	9/10
Joystiq	5/5
Polygon	9/10

Sunset Overdrive received "generally favorable" reviews from critics, according to review aggregator website Metacritic.

The game's tone was praised by reviewers. Daniel Bischoff from Game Revolution praised the game's comedic elements describing them as "contemporary". He added that the game is one of the rare few that made him laugh while playing. Sam Prell from Joystiq appreciated the humor, and thought that its quality was boosted by the performance of the voice-actors. His opinion was echoed by Peter Brown from GameSpot, who found the voice acting in the game entertaining and believable. However, Prell considered some humorous moments "hit-or-miss". Andrew Reiner from Game Informer described the game as a "full circle", in which Insomniac has incorporated all the elements from their previous games into this one. As a result, he thought that while the story emphasized comedy, it successfully reflected some pressing issues existing in society. Mollie L Patterson from Electronic Gaming Monthly appreciated the game's humor, but noted that it would not be able to satisfy every type of player. Arthur Gies from Polygon described the story as "gleefully stupid", and commended the self-aware narrative. Chris Carter from Destructoid praised the jokes featured in the game. However, he disliked the story, which he thought failed to offer motivation for players to complete the game.

Sunset Overdrive's gameplay was also commended by many reviewers. Prell compared the game favorably to Jet Grind Radio, Saints Row The Third, Infamous, and Ratchet & Clank. He singled out the traversal system, which he thought was fluid and well-executed. He added that the fast travel system was not useful in this game, since players can find a lot of fun by simply traveling between different locations in the game's world. He thought that all of the game's systems intertwined with each other, and ultimately made the game a complete and worthwhile experience. Reiner echoed similar thoughts, and considered getting around Sunset City fun for players. He added that the traversal system increased the game's replay value. However, he was disappointed by the game's occasionally repetitive mission design. Sliva and Brown shared similar thoughts, with the latter saying that the game featured too many fetch quests. Patterson disliked the game's traversal; she found that the system was frustrating at times. However, she thought that this problem lessened as players unlocked new moves and skills. Gies felt overwhelmed by the traversal options. He added that Insomniac had successfully created a system that was accessible for ordinary players, while creating challenges for those who want to master the system. However, he noted the camera system may not be able to track the movement of the character accurately. He further commended the game's world design, and described it as one of the most "navigationally sophisticated" worlds he had ever experienced in a game. Bischoff considered the shooting mechanic "loose", but thought that the problem was overshadowed by the game's forgiving aiming and steady difficulty curve. Lucas Sullivan also criticized the mechanic, calling it "inconsistent".

The customization options received acclaim. Bischoff praised the arsenal of weapons featured in the game, which he thought was deep, interesting, and creative, benefited by the Amps system, which added additional complexity to them. Prell described it as the "king" of the game. He praised the game's ability to allow players to customize their characters, and considered the weapons featured "varied", and thought they enhanced the game with personality. Reiner thought that all of the weapons featured in the game were fun to use, and that the amps system made experimenting with different weapons rewarding. Patterson also commended the game's weapons though she was initially skeptical about them. Gies thought that the customization options allowed players to play the game as they preferred, and described the character creator as "flexible". Marty Sliva from IGN praised the Amp upgrade system, which he felt encouraged players to try out unusual ways to experiment with it.

The game's art style was applauded. Bischoff praised the colorful graphics and the different graphical effects featured in the game. He further praised the game's presentation, which he thought would lead "the Xbox One console's personality this generation." Reiner compared the colorful graphics of the game to Sesame Street, and thought the bright colors "[electrified] the screen". Reiner also praised the "Next-Gen Respawn" system, and the protagonist's animation. Sliva praised the design of the city, as he thought it featured a unique artistic style, and aided the traversal system. He added that the game's visuals "pop", and compared them to the "Easter Bunny on an acid trip". Carter praised the variety existing within the game's world, which he considered has prevented the game's world from being repetitive, and made landmarks easily recognizable. Brown thought that the game did not look realistic, but felt this did not stop the game from being one of the best-looking games available for the console. Sullivan also praised the use of colors, which he found was organic and vibrant.

The game's multiplayer received mixed reviews. Prell thought that the mission-design was varied, and the voting system kept the mode from being repetitive. He also praised the interconnected structure between the single-player and multiplayer, noting that the items that could be carried over from multiplayer to campaign made the mode rewarding. Reiner thought that the action featured in this mode is satisfying, but thought that the system lacked enough depth and complexity to engage players. Patterson echoed similar thoughts, and felt that the ability of players to switch between the campaign and the Chaos Squad mode made the multiplayer mode a rewarding experience. Brown criticized the mode, saying that its difficulty was not properly scaled.

=== Sales ===
In the United Kingdom, Sunset Overdrive was the second best-selling game in its week of release, and was outsold by FIFA 15. In its second week of release, it was the eighth best-selling game.

In December 2023, Insomniac Games was targeted in a ransomware attack that compromised various development documents and personal employee information. Among the surfaced materials, it was revealed that Sunset Overdrive had a budget of $42.6 million. The game had sold around 1.9 million units since its initial release, and generated net sales of $49.7 million. The game only managed to generate $567 in profit for Insomniac Games.

=== Accolades ===
In addition to earning several nominations at major events and ceremonies, it was selected as Best Xbox One Game for the year 2014 by IGN, Hardcore Gamer, Game Revolution, as well as Best Original Game by IGN AU Black Beta Select Awards in December 2014.

Year	Award	Category	Result	Ref
2014	Game Critics Awards	Best Original Game	Nominated	
2014	Game Critics Awards	Best Action/Adventure Game	Nominated	
2014	The Game Awards 2014	Best Score/Soundtrack	Nominated	
2014	The Game Awards 2014	Best Action/Adventure Game	Nominated	
2015	NAVGTR awards	Song Collection	Nominated	
2015	11th British Academy Games Awards	Best Original Game	Nominated	
2015	18th Annual D.I.C.E. Awards	Outstanding Achievement in Animation	Nominated	
2015	18th Annual D.I.C.E. Awards	Outstanding Achievement in Art Direction	Nominated	
2015	18th Annual D.I.C.E. Awards	Outstanding Technical Achievement	Nominated	
2015	2015 Golden Joystick Awards	Best Original Game	Nominated	
2015	2015 Golden Joystick Awards	Best Visual Design	Nominated	
2015	2015 Golden Joystick Awards	Xbox Game of the Year	Nominated	
2015	SXSW Gaming Awards	Excellence in Technical Achievement	Nominated	
2015	SXSW Gaming Awards	Excellence in Design and Direction	Nominated	

== Future ==
On September 13, 2018, Insomniac Games expressed interest in making a Sunset Overdrive sequel after completing work on the first game. However, as the rights to the intellectual property is wholly owned by Insomniac, they would need to find a new publishing partner that can support the game's large scope. In August 2019, Insomniac Games was acquired by Sony Interactive Entertainment. Then SIE Chairman Shawn Layden stated that Sunset Overdrive 2 was not a priority for Sony and Insomniac. On May 4, 2021, Sony registered the trademark for Sunset Overdrive. Eleven days later, Smith said there is nothing stopping the studio developing a sequel to the game in an interview. He went on to express interest in returning to the series.

In December 2023, Insomniac Games was targeted in a ransomware attack by the group Rhysida, who published 1.6 terabytes (TB) of information concerning employee documentation, development assets and corporate timelines related to the developer. A planned Sunset Overdrive sequel was purportedly in production since 2015, but was cancelled the following year in favor of the studio prioritizing Marvel's Spider-Man (2018) for PlayStation 4. Additional materials from the hack revealed that the initial publishing agreement between Insomniac Games and Microsoft included the latter's rights to two sequels, any future downloadable content, derivative games such as spin-offs, and subsequent ports or re-releases.
