= Satsuma Loans =

- Industry: Financial services, Technology finance
- Founded: 2013
- Defunct: 2021
- Fate: Closed down after miss-selling losses
- Headquarters: Bradford, United Kingdom
- Products: Short-term credit, payday loans
- Number of employees: 300 (2021)
- Parent: Provident Personal Credit
- Website: satsumaloans.co.uk

Satsuma Loans (a trading name of Provident Personal Credit) was a British an online loan provider and payday lender offering short-term loans. It was launched by doorstep lender Provident Financial in 2013 and was closed down in 2021.

Satsuma Loans charged a typical annual percentage rate of 991% as of March 2017, with a maximum interest rate of 1,575%.

Satsuma used to lend up to £1,000 to first time customers which could be borrowed over a 12-month period, incurring an interest charge of £990 on a £1,000 loan. Satsuma Loans offered fixed weekly or monthly repayment plans and claim that there were no hidden fees or charges with their loans.

== History ==
The Satsuma brand was launched by Provident Personal Credit in 2013. Provident had been in the business of providing small doorstep loans since 1880s.

Satsuma had £5 million of loans as of 2015, increasing from £1.8 million the previous year.

Between 2014 and 2016 Satsuma Loans sponsored RFU Championship side Yorkshire Carnegie in a deal worth £600,000. In 2016 it was announced that Satsuma Loans would become an official partner of Sunderland A.F.C. This prompted Sharon Hodgson, the MP for Washington and Sunderland West, to write to the club warning that associating themselves with a high-interest lender would undermine their positive community engagement work.

Satsuma was closed down in 2021.

== See also ==
- Payday loans in the United Kingdom
