= Secure Trust Bank =

British bank

Secure Trust Bank Public Limited Company
- Type: Public (LSE: STB)
- Industry: Financial services
- Founded: 1952
- Headquarters: Solihull, United Kingdom
- Key people: Jim Brown (Chairman); Ian Corfield (CEO)
- Products: Business banking, motor finance, retail finance, savings
- Revenue: ▲£213.5 million (2025)
- Operating income: ▲£51.6 million (2025)
- Net income: ▼£17.6 million (2025)
- Total assets: ▲£4,316.0 million (2025)
- Total equity: ▲£374.3 million (2025)
- Website: securetrustbank.com

Secure Trust Bank Public Limited Company is a British retail and commercial banking group listed on the London Stock Exchange, where it is a constituent of the FTSE SmallCap Index.

== History ==
The bank was established in 1952 as Secure Homes Limited and became a subsidiary of the Arbuthnot Banking Group in 1985. The company became Secure Trust Bank PLC in 1994 and was floated on the London Stock Exchange in an initial public offering in November 2011.

In 2012, the bank acquired Everyday Loans, a branch-based provider of unsecured personal loans to customers in the near-prime and sub-prime credit markets. However, just three years later, in December 2015, the bank agreed to sell Everyday Loans Holdings Limited to Non-Standard Finance for an enterprise value of £235 million; the transaction completed in April 2016.

In 2016 the Arbuthnot Banking Group reduced its majority stake from 51.9% to 20%, for about £145 million.

In January 2021, Secure Trust Bank announced that CEO Paul Lynam would be stepping down with immediate effect, to be replaced by David McCreadie, a former Managing Director at Tesco Bank.

In March 2022, Secure Trust Bank announced it would be selling the Debt Managers business, which had bought some nine years earlier, to Swedish firm Intrum.

In May 2022, Secure Trust Bank completed the acquisition of BNPL start-up AppToPay which will operate as part of V12 Retail Finance to offer a BNPL style product alongside its traditional retail finance products.

In June 2025, the bank appointed Ian Corfield as chief executive: Corfield had previously worked as HM Treasury's director of investment, a job in which he last just five months after it was revealed that he had personally donated some £20,000 to the election campaigns of Labour Party Members of Parliament. The bank, having become embroiled in the motor finance scandal in which it failed to disclose discretionary commissions to customers, made a cumulative provision of £21 million in October 2025 to compensate victims of the scheme.

== Operations ==
The bank offers a variety of savings accounts and consumer and business lending products. Motor finance is offered via hire purchase through its Moneyway brand, and hire purchase, personal contract purchase and dealership finance through the V12 Vehicle Finance brand.
