= Non-Standard Finance =

Consumer finance company

Non-Standard Finance plc
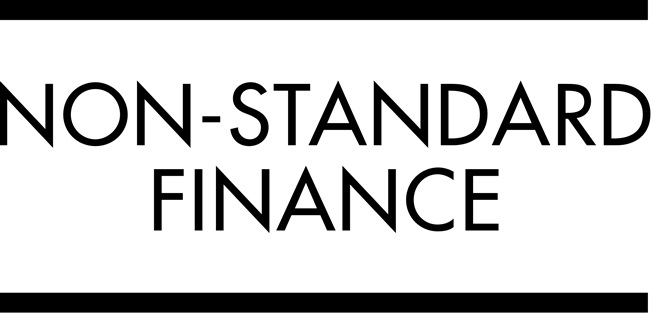
- Type: Public
- Traded as: LSE: NSF
- Industry: Financial services
- Founded: 2015
- Defunct: 2023
- Fate: Operating businesses transferred to secured lenders; orderly wind-down commenced
- Headquarters: London, UK
- Key people: John van Kuffeler (founder and chairman)
- Brands: Loans at Home, Everyday Loans
- Services: Home credit, loans, unsecured loans
- Revenue: £31.3 million (H1 2016)
- Operating income: £3.9 million (H1 2016)
- Net income: £1.3 million (H1 2016)

Non-Standard Finance plc (NSF) was a UK-based consumer finance company that provided home credit under the brand Loans at Home and branch-based unsecured consumer loans under the brand Everyday Loans. Loans at Home was the UK's third-largest provider of home credit (home-collected personal loans), and Everyday Loans was the largest non-bank branch-based provider of unsecured consumer loans in the UK.

In February 2019, NSF launched a hostile takeover bid for Provident Financial valued at approximately £1.3 billion, which lapsed in June 2019 after failing to secure regulatory approval. Following a financial restructuring in 2023, NSF's operating businesses were transferred to a new group owned by its secured lenders, and the company commenced an orderly wind-down.

== History ==
=== Formation and acquisitions (2015–2017) ===
NSF was established in February 2015 by John van Kuffeler, who ran home credit group Provident Financial for 22 years before retiring in December 2013. The firm was formed with £48m backing from a group of investors. NSF was listed on the London Stock Exchange in February 2015 as a cash shell, raising £100m for the acquisition of existing short-term consumer finance companies.

In August 2015, the firm acquired Loansathome4u, the home credit arm of finance group S&U, for £82.5m.

In December 2015, the firm acquired Everyday Loans (a branch-based lending chain owned by Secure Trust Bank) for £235m. The transaction was funded by bank debt along with £160m in new equity finance.

NSF declared its first interim dividend in August 2016.

In August 2017, the firm acquired George Banco, a guarantor lender, for £53.5m.

=== Attempted acquisition of Provident Financial (2019) ===
On 22 February 2019, NSF launched an unsolicited takeover bid for Provident Financial, a larger rival in the sub-prime lending sector whose former chief executive, John van Kuffeler, had founded NSF. The all-share offer valued Provident at approximately £1.3 billion, with NSF offering 8.88 new shares for each Provident share.

Provident's board rejected the bid, describing it as "financially flawed" and questioning NSF's management capability to operate Provident's Vanquis Bank credit card business. The bid attracted support from investors holding approximately 50% of Provident's shares, including Woodford Investment Management, Invesco and Marathon Asset Management, but faced opposition from shareholders including Schroders, Janus Henderson and M&G.

The Competition and Markets Authority opened an investigation into the proposed merger in February 2019, though it subsequently found the transaction did not qualify for investigation under the merger provisions of the Enterprise Act 2002 after the offer lapsed. The Financial Conduct Authority also warned that it would act on any rise in unaffordable lending following a successful takeover.

On 4 June 2019, NSF announced that regulatory conditions for the offer would not be satisfied by the deadline, and the bid lapsed. The Prudential Regulation Authority had concluded that the merged group would not meet minimum regulatory capital requirements. Total fees associated with the failed bid amounted to between £10 million and £10.5 million before VAT, contributing to an exceptional charge of £25.3 million in the first half of 2019. Provident described the withdrawal as being "in the best interests" of its shareholders, stating that it "greatly regrets the unnecessary distraction, cost and impact of the uncertainty" caused by the bid.

=== Financial restructuring and wind-down (2023) ===
In 2023, the NSF group underwent a financial restructuring centred on a scheme of arrangement proposed by Everyday Lending Limited, addressing historical redress liabilities relating to loans made prior to 31 March 2021. The scheme made £14 million available to satisfy claims by borrowers and fees owed to the Financial Ombudsman Service.

A proposed recapitalisation was considered but major shareholder Alchemy Partners declined to back a fundraising. Instead, NSF's operating business - principally the Everyday Loans brand - was transferred to a newly incorporated group owned by its secured lenders. In exchange, the secured lenders released £70 million of their secured debt and extended the maturity date of the remaining facilities.

Non-Standard Finance plc subsequently commenced an orderly wind-down, with shareholders expected to receive no value from the process. The company's shares had fallen approximately 78% during 2023 prior to the scheme's approval.

The Everyday Loans business continued to trade under new ownership and rebranded as Evlo in March 2025.

== Operations ==
NSF operated in three main areas of consumer lending: home credit, guarantor loans and branch-based unsecured lending.

Through Loans at Home (previously Loansathome4u), it served approximately 98,000 customers from 40 branches in England, Wales and Scotland. Through Everyday Loans, it served a further 37,000 customers from approximately 40 branches across the UK as of mid-2016. By 2022, the Everyday Loans branch network had expanded to over 75 locations with a net loan book of £167 million.

In August 2017, NSF also acquired George Banco Limited, a specialist guarantor loan provider, for an enterprise value of £53.5 million, diversifying the group's offerings into the guarantor lending segment.
