= Unsecured guarantor loan =

Loan in which a party agrees to repay the borrower's debt if they default

In personal finance, a guarantor loan is a type of unsecured loan that requires a guarantor to co-sign the credit agreement. A guarantor is a person who agrees to repay the borrower's debt should the borrower default on agreed repayments. The guarantor is often a family member or trusted friend who has a better credit history than the person taking out the loan and the arrangement is, therefore, viewed as less risky by the lender. A guarantor loan can, consequently, enable someone to borrow either more money, or the same amount at a lower rate of interest, than they would otherwise be able to secure through a more traditional type of loan.

Guarantors are often parents who want to help out their young adult children – it could be help raising the deposit for their first home, or it could be to buy a new car or complete a training course that will help them on the next step of their career. There are many reasons why young people may need such help and the fact they cannot obtain a loan themselves does not mean that they are not financially responsible or able to pay back the loan. Although these loans can be used to help provide financially responsible individuals with lending they could not otherwise access, it is important to recognize that they do carry significant risks for the guarantor, who is liable for the full debt amount should the borrower be unable to make repayment. A report suggests that these loans could be as damaging as payday loans, with 43% of guarantors in the study unclear about their financial liability.

Guarantor loans are sometimes seen as alternatives to payday loans and associated with the sub-prime finance industry. This is due to them being aimed at people with a less than perfect credit score. This may be because of previously missed debt re-payments. However, this is only one aspect of guarantor loans. They are also aimed at young people who have no credit score, due to having never obtained credit in the past such as new graduates just embarking on their career - these people are often high earners with sensible financial habits so can afford the repayments but do not have the credit history to reassure the lender about the level of risk. As mainstream lending criteria are often automated and does not come with a personal review of the applicant's financial circumstances it is sometimes the only way a young adult in their first job can secure a loan.

== History ==
Although guarantor loans are a relatively recent to the unsecured loan market, at least since the 2008 financial crisis, it was not uncommon for people to be asked to provide a guarantor to co-sign other forms of financial agreement. Such as in residential letting contracts, where young people without previous references were often required to provide a guarantor and in the mortgage industry, where guarantors are often used to help people obtain a mortgage when they would otherwise be declined due to being considered a credit risk.

Since the 2008 financial crisis, there has been rapid growth in a whole range of personal loans such as guarantor loans that might be classed as alternative loans. These are loans that are not obtained through the traditional sources of mainstream banks or other lending institutions such as credit unions or building societies but more typically through loan brokers and niche lenders. There are many reasons why people are increasingly choosing less conventional borrowing but the biggest two, by far are lack of availability and cost.

The strict lending criteria implemented since 2008 means that anyone with no credit history or an imperfect credit history either cannot secure a bank loan at all or will only be able to secure one at a high rate of interest.

However, guarantor loans are by no means a panacea for this situation - they themselves have high interest rates significantly above standard personal loans (albeit over shorter time periods) and pose a risk to the guarantor who may not be aware of the full extent of the commitment they are undertaking. Anyone being asked to act as a guarantor on a loan should ensure they fully understand their own liability.

These loans are sometimes used by angel investors to help out startup companies where the investor is unwilling or unable to provide direct funding.

== United Kingdom ==
=== Growth of the sector ===
The UK guarantor loan market grew rapidly following the 2008 financial crisis, as tighter mainstream lending criteria left millions of consumers unable to access bank loans. By 2018, the sector was serving over 150,000 customers, with Amigo Loans dominating the market with an estimated 88% share. Other significant lenders included TFS Loans, George Banco (owned by Non-Standard Finance), Buddy Loans and TrustTwo.

Amigo Loans was floated on the London Stock Exchange in June 2018 with a valuation of £1.3 billion, making it one of the largest sub-prime consumer finance companies in the UK at the time.

=== Regulatory intervention and collapse ===
From 2019 onwards, the Financial Conduct Authority (FCA) raised significant concerns about affordability practices across the guarantor loan sector. The regulator found widespread failures by lenders to conduct adequate checks on whether borrowers and, critically, their guarantors could afford the loan repayments. Complaints surged dramatically; Amigo Loans alone saw complaints rise from 583 in 2019 to over 14,000 in 2020.

In May 2020, the FCA imposed lending restrictions on Amigo, effectively banning new loan origination. The regulator subsequently publicly censured the company in February 2023 for failures in assessing borrower and guarantor circumstances, stating it would have imposed a fine of £72.9 million but waived it to protect the company's ability to pay redress to customers.

TFS Loans entered administration in February 2022 and was subsequently fined £811,900 by the FCA for deficient affordability checks on 3,150 guarantors between November 2015 and April 2018. Non-Standard Finance placed its guarantor loans division (George Banco and TrustTwo) into managed run-off in 2021, citing intense regulatory scrutiny.

Amigo ceased lending in March 2023 and its subsidiaries were placed into liquidation in 2025 after processing over 210,000 compensation claims. Affected customers received approximately 18.5p in the pound — far below the 41p originally estimated — after the volume of claims significantly exceeded expectations.

By 2025, every major UK guarantor loan provider had either entered administration, been liquidated, or ceased lending, effectively ending the sector as a significant part of the UK consumer credit market.

== Consumer demographics ==
Users of guarantor loans are often people who would be rejected by mainstream lenders, such as banks and credit card providers, due to having less than perfect credit scores or no credit history at all, such as young people just starting out in their first job. In the UK alone, for example, there are an estimated seven million consumers who would not be eligible for a bank loan because of their credit score or their lack of credit history.

Some guarantor loan companies aimed to position themselves as a better alternative to payday loans, by offering loans at lower APRs than those offered by payday loan companies, whilst still higher than prime-credit consumers can access through mainstream banks.

== See also ==
- Alternative financial services
- Surety
- Payday loan
- Personal guarantee
- Amigo Holdings
- Non-Standard Finance
- Subprime lending
