= Manjit Wolstenholme =

- Born: 4 July 1964
- Died: 23 November 2017 (aged 53)
- Education: University of Bristol
- Occupations: Accountant and businesswoman
- Title: Chair and acting CEO of Provident Financial

Manjit Wolstenholme (4 July 1964 – 23 November 2017) was a British businesswoman, and the chairman and acting CEO of Provident Financial.

== Early life and education ==
Wolstenholme was born on 4 July 1964 in Wolverhampton, Staffordshire, England. She studied chemistry at the University of Bristol.

== Career ==
Wolstenholme trained as a chartered accountant with Coopers & Lybrand. She worked for Dresdner Kleinwort for 13 years, rising to co-head of investment banking.

In February 2011, she became a non-executive director of Future Publishing. She became chairman of Provident Financial in January 2014. She was also appointed as chairwoman of Cala Homes, and director of the Unite Group and CMC Markets. In August 2017, she said having five appointments was "not a problem", adding "I can assure you I have the time necessary."

== Death ==
Wolstenholme died suddenly on 23 November 2017; she was 53. She had had a heart attack triggered by deep vein thrombosis.
