= Provident Skate Park =

Skate park in Visalia, California, USA

Coordinates: 36.3327°N 119.3034°W

Provident Skate Park is a skateboard and inline skate park in Visalia, California.

== Creation ==
It was created in December 1996 when the Kaweah Delta Health Care District led in an effort to create a park specifically for skateboarders and inline skaters. The hospital received many donations, including a large sum from the Provident Mortgage Corporation, after which the park was named. The hospital also initiated a payroll deduction option for the hospital's employees. With these combined efforts, the Kaweah Delta Health Care District was able to raise over $260,000. Over 80% of the funds spent on the creation of the park were from the efforts of the community.

=== Approval ===
After most of the necessary money had been accumulated, the Visalia City Council approved an area of 3 acres (12,000 m^{2}) at Recreation Park for Provident Skate Park to be built. A unique team of several local skateboarders, a contractor, a draftsman and city and hospital staff were brought together to create a unique design. Several meetings were held for skateboarders to share their ideas to help make the park fun and different, while catering to their interests. In order for the skate park to succeed, it had to have the ability to keep skaters off private property and let them have their own area to skate. The skaters suggested elements that would hold their attention and helped emulate regular street skating. Benches, rails and steps were suggested by the skaters and eventually created alongside the pipes and volcanoes.

== The Park ==
Provident Skate Park is 24,000 square feet (2,200 m^{2}) in diameter, with dimensions of 300'x100'. It has been identified as one of the largest municipal skate parks in California. Some of its more attractive features are a large funbox, barbells, volcanoes and a snake run, which ends in a bowl. One can skate the benches as well, seeing as how most of them are concrete. The park can accommodate up to 75 people skating in it at one time, and the layout of the park itself allows the skater to be in perpetual motion. by riding through hips and volcanoes at various locations, the skater is able to keep skating. The park itself is essentially divided into three parts, for beginner, intermediate and advanced skaters.

== Trivia ==
- Provident is the site of the eventual suicide of the titular protagonist in the 2002 movie Ken Park, which was never published in the United States due to its controversial content.
