= James Benamor =

British businessman (born 1977)

- Born: 18 May 1977 (age 49); Bournemouth, Dorset, England
- Occupation: Businessman

James Benamor (born 18 May 1977) is a British businessman.

== Business activities ==
Benamor became one of the wealthiest young people in the United Kingdom after starting his loan brokerage company, the Richmond Group, in 1999 at the age of 21. Unable to afford advertising at the time he printed leaflets and delivered them on foot, walking 300 km and delivering 30,000 leaflets in the first month.

In 2005 he founded Amigo Holdings, a guarantor loans lender.

Benamor quit the board of Amigo Holdings in March 2020, The Richmond Group did own 61% of the company. until April 2020.

In April 2020, Benamor demanded a meeting with the board to replace the current bosses of the company. when this failed the Richmond group sold all of its holdings.

== Net worth ==
In 2018 his net worth rocketed to £1.1 billion when Amigo Holdings floated on the London Stock Exchange in July 2018. but by April 2020 Amigo shares crashed 90% and as of May 2022, Benamor net worth is now around 100 million.

The growth of Benamor's Richmond Group has attracted media attention. In 2007 it was reported by the Sunday Times Fast Track 100 as 29th fastest growing company in terms of sales, in 2008 it was ranked 34th in the UK by the Profit Track 100 for profit growth, and in 2008, 2009 and 2010 it was rated as one of the 100 best companies in the Sunday Times '100 Best Companies to Work For'. In 2010 Benamor and the Richmond Group won an Ernst & Young Entrepreneur of the year Award.

== Criticism ==
Benamor has been criticised by the Daily Mirror and the BBC for the Richmond Group's ownership of Advantage Loans, a credit broker which ceased trading in 2008. He charged applicants a £50 fee but not all of them received a loan. Customers had to struggle to get their money back.

== Television appearances ==
Benamor was featured in an edition of the Channel 4 documentary series Secret Millionaire, aired on 5 August 2008, a show where wealthy business people go undercover to look for deserving people to give money to.

The programme was set in Moss Side in Manchester and revealed that Benamor had dabbled in drugs and turned to petty crime as a teenager. A follow-up show broadcast on Christmas Day 2008 showed that Benamor had continued to work with The Settlement, a Manchester charity which appeared on the original show. This included setting up a work experience scheme which had paid for a number of disadvantaged teenagers from Manchester to visit Bournemouth and undergo training and work experience at his company. The scheme was also covered by the BBC.
