= Funbox =

Skatepark feature

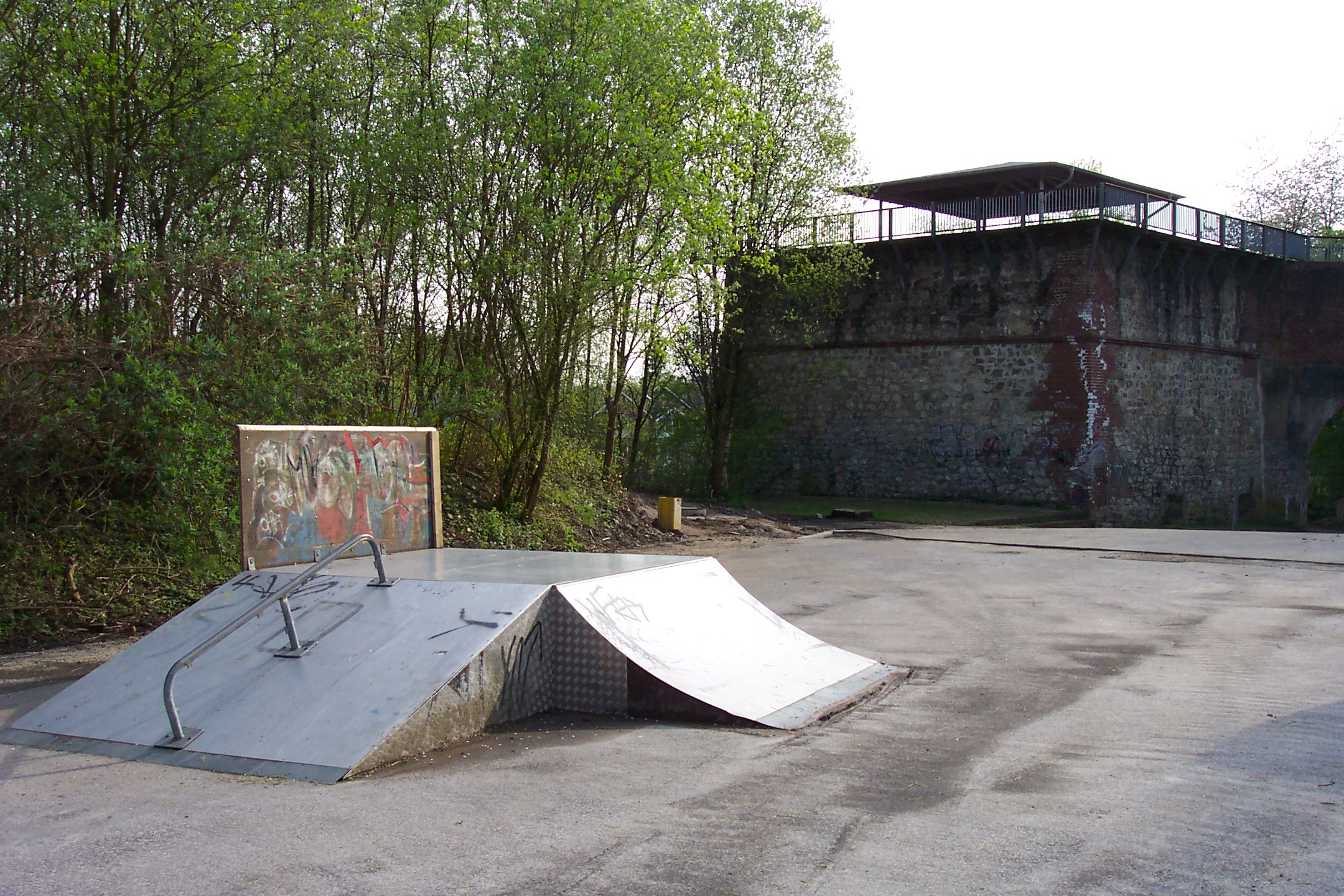
A funbox with rail.

A funbox is a standard element of a skatepark. It generally consists of a box shape with a flat top and a ramp on two or more sides. A funbox may also include other elements that allow for more complicated skateboarding tricks.

Like other skatepark features, funboxes are used by skateboarders, roller skaters using inline skates or quad skates, and BMX-riders.

== Features ==
Table-top - The main characteristic of a funbox is the standard table-top; the flat top of the main structural box component. The table-top can vary in height and surface area.

Ramps - To allow access to the table-top, a funbox will generally be surrounded (on two or more sides) by ramps or stairs to allow tricks or transitions on, off or over the table-top.

Other elements - A funbox may also include a number of other elements including ledges, rails, spines, copings, angled ramps, wall sections to allow "wallrides" and improvised street furniture pieces.

A funbox with ramps on opposite sides may allow for the conduct of aerial tricks. As such, funboxes are commonly placed in line with the "outlet" of a larger ramp to allow for a build-up of speed. Typically, a funbox with ramps or transitions on all sides of the table will be placed in the middle of a park.

== Construction ==
Funboxes are generally constructed of concrete (as a permanent element in a skatepark) or wood (as a moveable or customizable element for street skateboarding). Some variations include steel frames and both concrete and wood constructions will often include steel copings or rails. Some funboxes will be constructed in sections to allow for further customization.

The construction must resist dynamic structural load resulting from aerial tricks or jumps onto the funbox.

Funbox variations
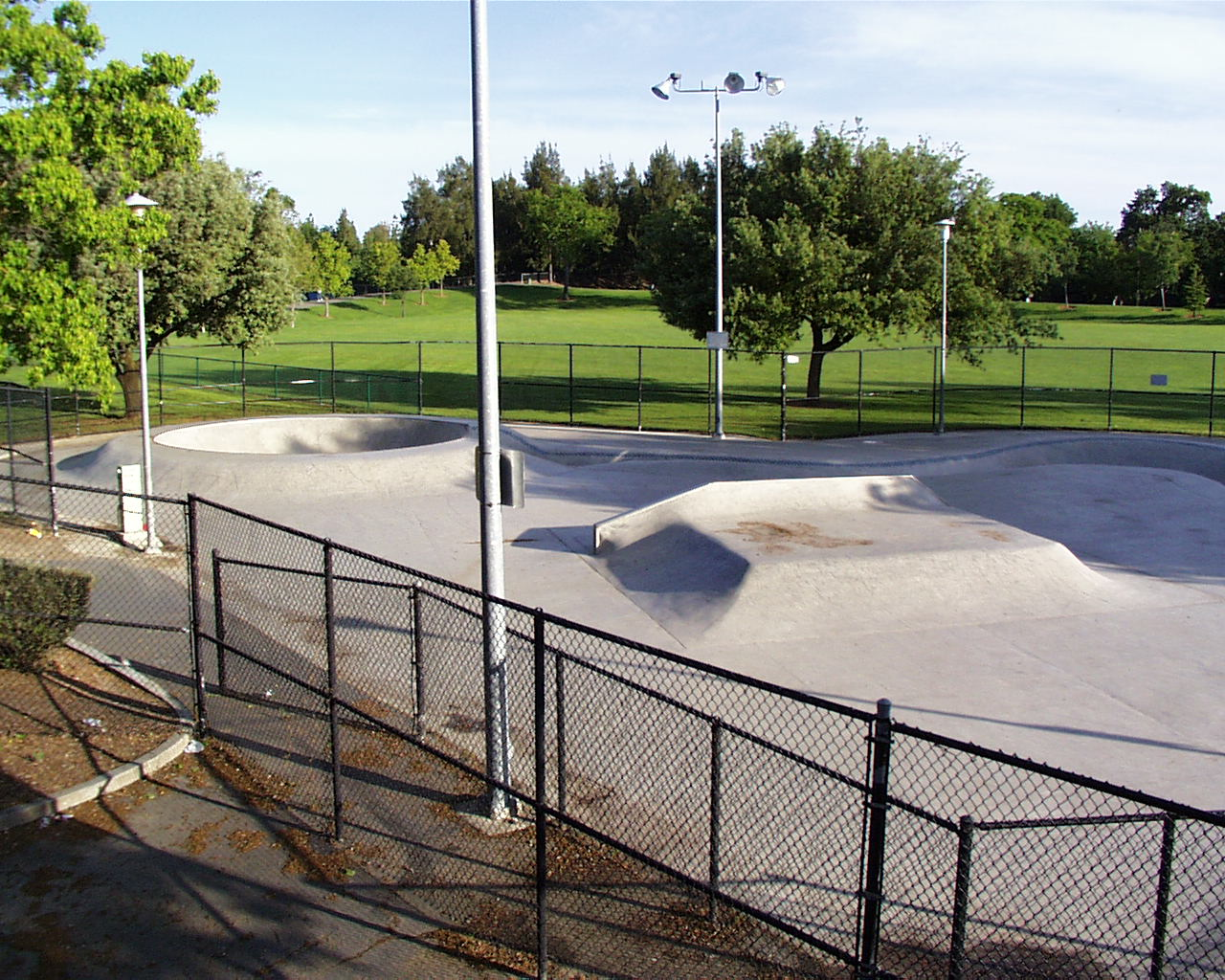
A concrete funbox in Davis, California.

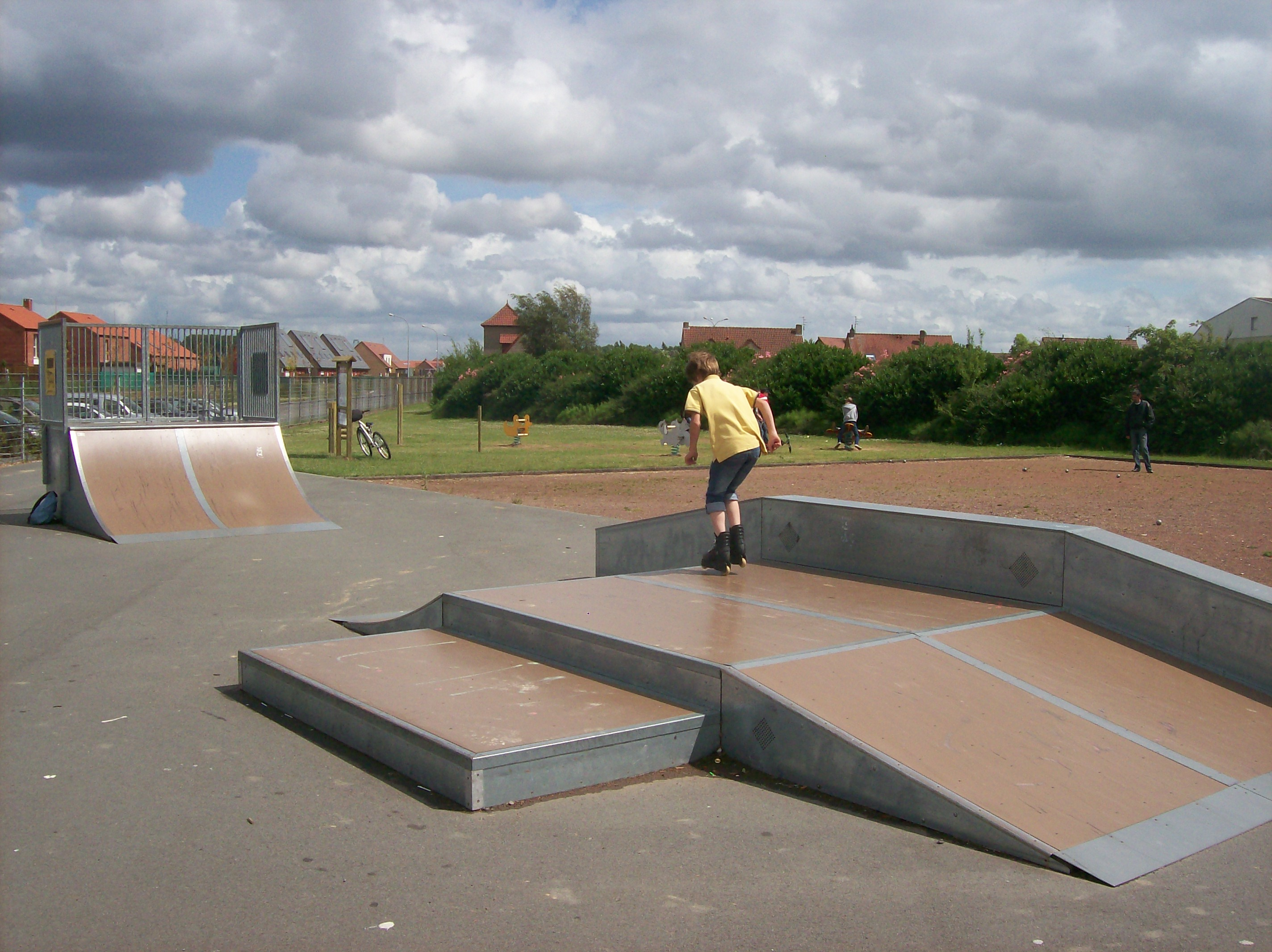
A concrete and steel funbox.

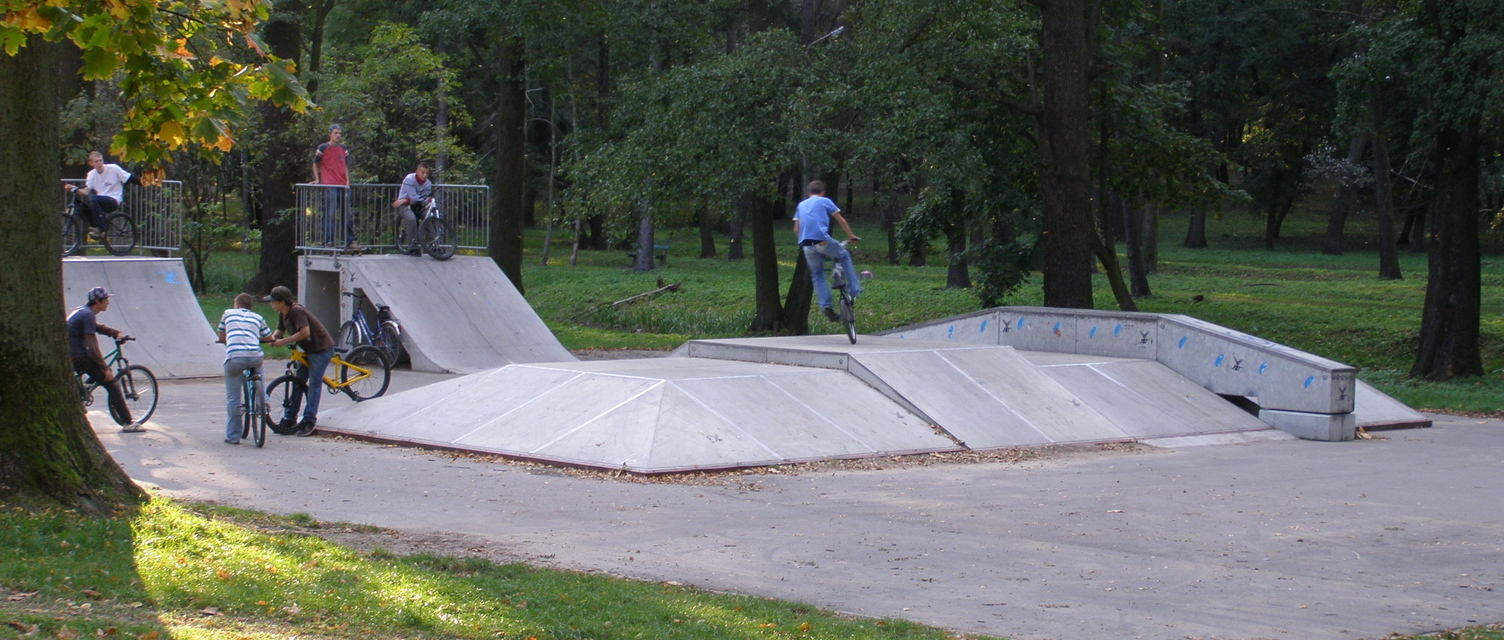
A large flat concrete funbox in Mińsk Mazowiecki.

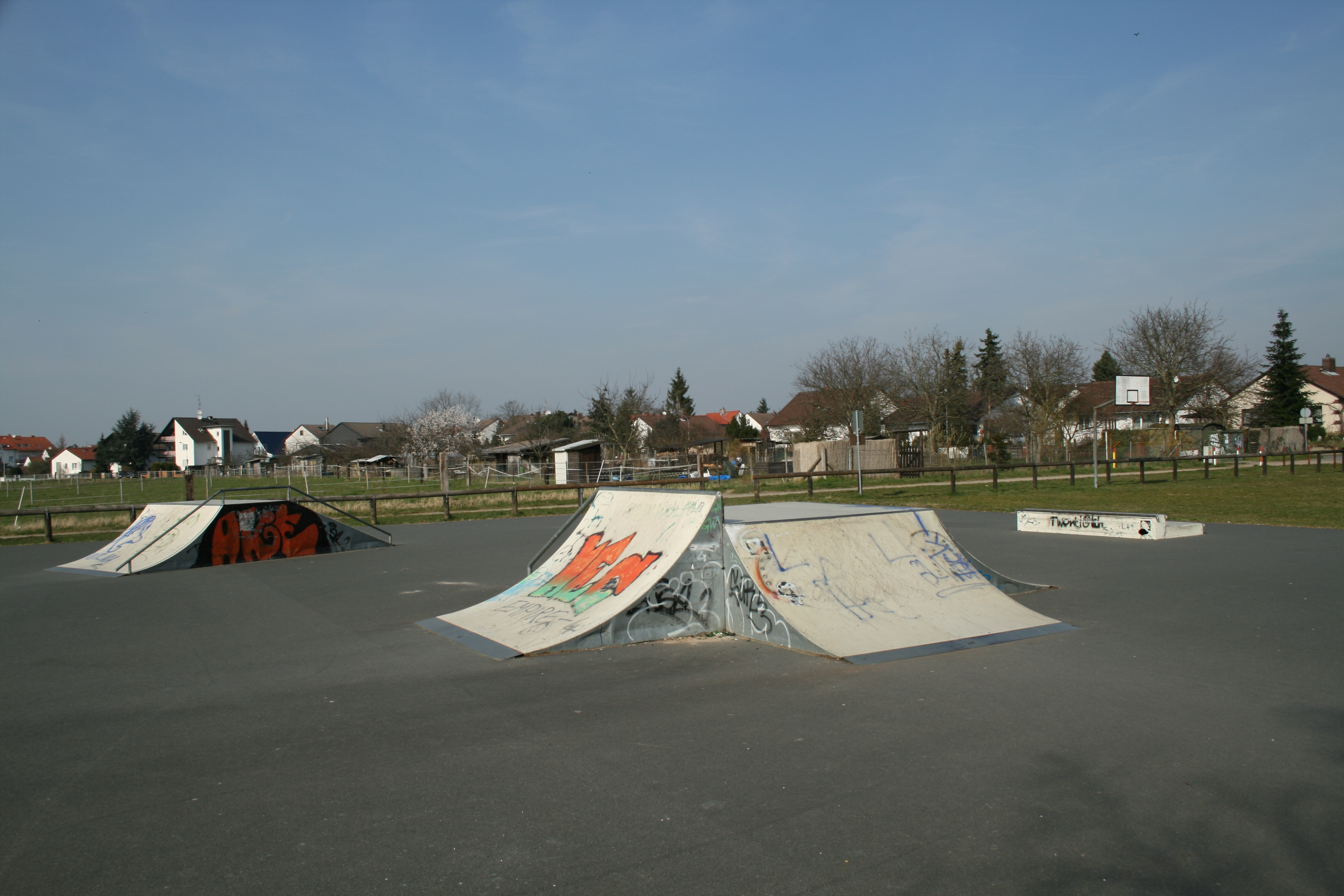
Two funbox variations in the same park in Pfungstadt.
