= International Personal Finance =

British financial services company

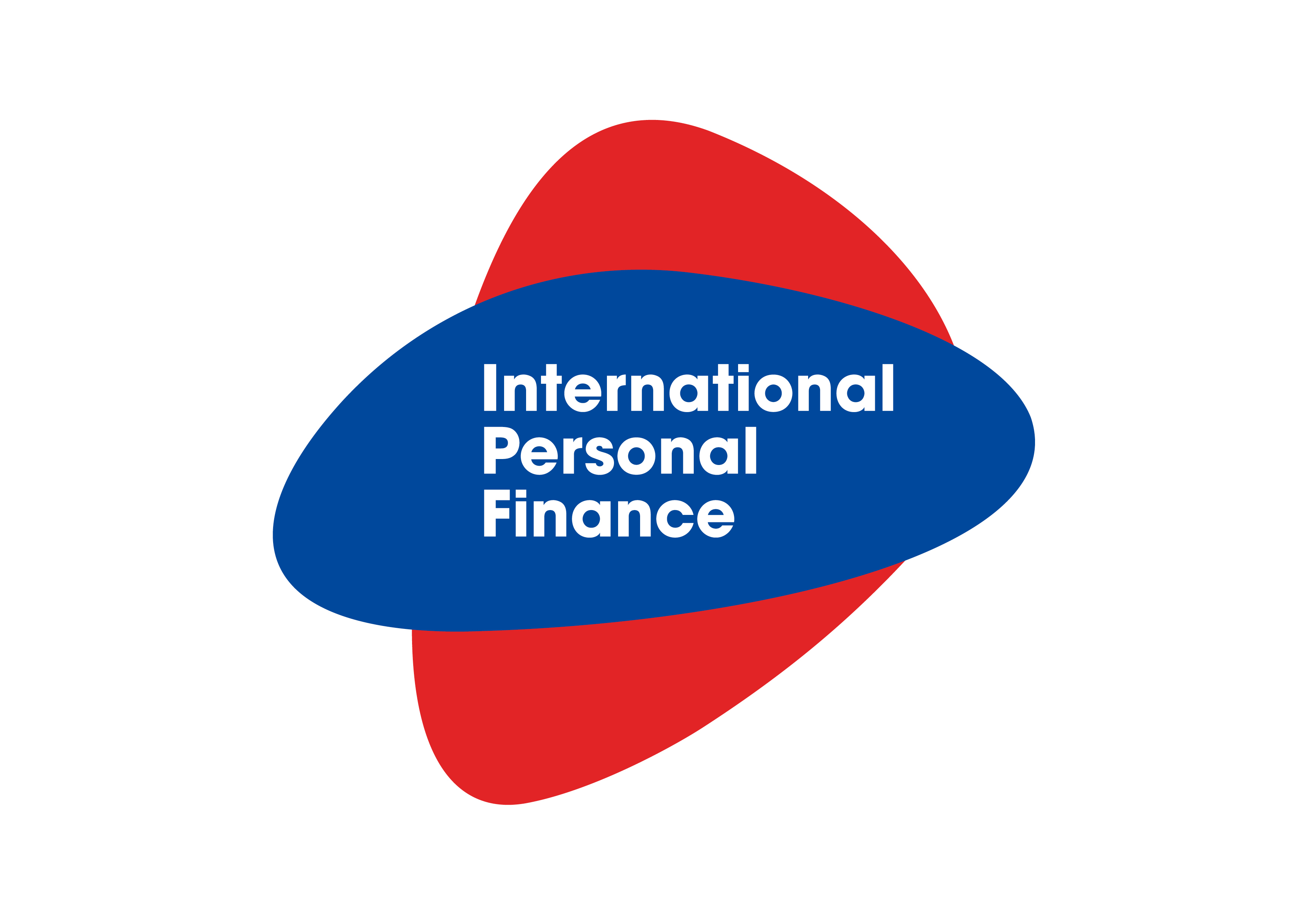
- Type: Public
- Traded as: LSE: IPF
- Industry: Finance
- Founded: 1997
- Headquarters: Leeds, West Yorkshire, UK
- Key people: Stuart Sinclair, Chairman; Gerard Ryan, Chief Executive Officer; Gary Thompson, Chief Financial Officer
- Revenue: ▲£737.5 million (2025)
- Operating income: ▲£88.6 million (2025)
- Net income: ▼£54.2 million (2025)
- Website: www.ipfin.co.uk

International Personal Finance is a British-based international financial services business providing home credit and digital consumer credit to 1.7 million customers in nine markets. It took a secondary listing on the Warsaw Stock Exchange in March 2013 but delisted in 2022. It is also listed on the London Stock Exchange until it was acquired by BasePoint Capital in August 2026.

== History ==
The company was first established as a division of Provident Financial in 1997. It was demerged from Provident Financial in 2007 and listed on the London Stock Exchange on 16 July 2007. It went on to acquire Maritime Commercial Bank of Kaliningrad in 2008, before closing its pilot Russian operation in 2009. IPF acquired digital loans company MCB Finance in 2015.

In December 2025, it was announced that company would be acquired by BasePoint Capital for £543 million ($733 million). All regulatory clearances were received by 3 July 2026, so allowing the transaction to be completed on 4 August 2026.

== Operations ==
The company has operations organised as follows:

- Poland – home credit and digital
- Hungary – home credit
- Romania – home credit
- Czech Republic – home credit and digital
- Mexico – home credit and digital
- Australia – digital
- Latvia – digital
- Lithuania – digital
- Estonia – digital
