= Income-sensitive repayment =

There are income-sensitive repayment options available to U.S. federal student loan borrowers, allowing Federal Family Education Loan Program borrowers to decide what percentage of their income their loan payment will be.

The borrower selects a monthly payment amount between 4–25% of his or her monthly income. The payment must be greater than or equal to the interest accruing on the loan. The borrower must reapply for this schedule every year. It is available for up to 5 years.

After 5 years, the borrower will need to choose another repayment schedule. The borrower may have up to 10 additional years under a new schedule.

Income-sensitive repayment extends the repayment period. As a result, the total amount paid in interest may be greater than what the borrower would pay under standard repayment.
