= Amigo Holdings =

Former British guarantor loan provider

- Company type: Public
- Traded as: LSE: AMGO
- Industry: Financial services
- Founded: 2005; 21 years ago
- Founder: James Benamor
- Headquarters: Bournemouth
- Area served: United Kingdom
- Key people: Nick Beal, CEO
- Services: Guarantor loans (ceased 2023)
- Revenue: £210.8 million (2018)
- Operating income: £66.1 million (2018)
- Net income: £50.6 million (2018)

Amigo Holdings is a British public company formerly trading as a guarantor loans provider under the brand Amigo Loans. At its peak in 2018, the company was valued at £1.3 billion and held approximately 88% of the UK guarantor loan market.

Following an investigation by the Financial Conduct Authority (FCA) into failures in affordability checks, the company ceased lending in March 2023 and its lending subsidiary, Amigo Loans Ltd, entered an orderly wind-down. The subsidiary was placed into liquidation in 2025 after processing over 210,000 compensation claims under a court-approved scheme of arrangement. Amigo Holdings plc remains listed on the London Stock Exchange as a shell company exploring reverse takeover opportunities.

== History ==
=== Founding and growth (2005–2018) ===
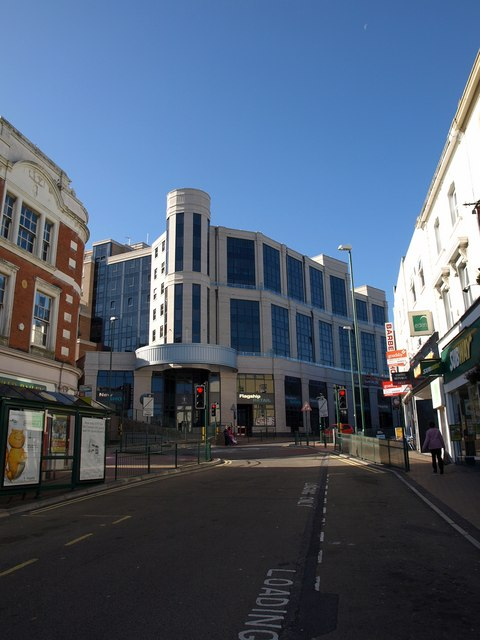
Amigo Holdings' former offices in Bournemouth

The company was established as a mid-cost guarantor loans lender by James Benamor in 2005. Benamor stood down as CEO, handing over the role to Glen Crawford, in 2015. In June 2018 the company was the subject of an initial public offering on the London Stock Exchange which valued the company at £1.3 billion.

=== Affordability complaints and FCA investigation (2019–2022) ===
The company announced in July 2020 that it would be providing at least £35 million in order to address consumer complaints regarding lack of checks on affordability when taking out a loan.

On 1 June 2021, it was reported that Amigo faced possible bankruptcy after a High Court judge rejected an attempt by the company to cap payouts to customers through a first scheme of arrangement, after the FCA argued it benefited shareholders too much and was unfair to customers. Gary Jennison, Chief Executive Officer of Amigo, commented: "Without a scheme, Amigo faces insolvency as it will be unable to satisfy its customer compensation claims as well as meeting the legally binding funding obligations owed to its secured creditors."

A revised second scheme of arrangement was subsequently proposed and approved, which included raising equity from shareholders and contributing £15 million from the proceeds into the scheme to increase cash refunds to customers.

In February 2023, the FCA publicly censured Amigo Loans Ltd for failures between November 2018 and March 2020 in assessing borrower and guarantor circumstances before approving loans. The FCA stated that it would have imposed a fine of £72.9 million but waived it on the grounds that it would cause serious financial hardship and threaten the company's ability to pay redress to customers under the scheme.

=== Closure and wind-down (2023–2025) ===
On 27 March 2023, Amigo announced that it would stop lending with immediate effect and that its lending subsidiary, Amigo Loans Ltd, would be placed into an orderly wind-down. A proposed recapitalisation had failed after the company was unable to raise sufficient funds from investors. All surplus assets were to be transferred to creditors of the compensation scheme, with affected customers expected to receive approximately 17p in the pound.

Danny Malone, who had been appointed CEO in September 2022, oversaw the initial wind-down before stepping down on 31 December 2023. Kerry Penfold succeeded him as CEO in January 2024.

Over 210,000 claims were submitted under the scheme, far exceeding the company's original expectations and reducing the payout to 18.51p in the pound — comprising an initial payment of 12.5p distributed in late 2024 and a final payment of 6.01p in early 2025. In total, £85.1 million in refunds and £72.9 million in cash redress were paid to claimants.

The company's remaining loan portfolio was progressively sold through competitive tenders during 2024, and by January 2025 all customer accounts had been settled, sold or written off. Staff numbers fell from approximately 200 at the time of closure to a minimal level to support final scheme operations. The lending subsidiaries surrendered their FCA authorisations and were placed into liquidation in 2025.

CEO Kerry Penfold commented: "Mistakes of the past have cost Amigo and its shareholders dearly, but this chapter is now drawing to a close."

=== Amigo Holdings shell company (2024–present) ===
While the lending business was wound down, the parent company Amigo Holdings plc remained listed on the London Stock Exchange. In April and May 2024, the company raised funds through a small capital raise to maintain solvency while the board explored reverse takeover opportunities. In October 2025, Amigo appointed Craig Ransley as a board consultant to assist in identifying a reverse takeover target in the mining sector, and investors agreed to subscribe for £1.5 million in convertible loan notes subject to shareholder approval. Should no viable opportunity emerge before available funds are exhausted, the board has indicated it intends to seek shareholder approval for delisting and voluntary liquidation.

== Operations ==
The company issued mid-cost loans with payments guaranteed by a borrower's family or friends. The amount lent was up to £10,000, with a 49.9% APR, higher than loans from mainstream banks, but lower than high-cost products such as payday loans or rent-to-own. The company had secured around 88% of the guarantor loan market in the UK.

== Legal ==
Amigo Holdings trading as Amigo Loans was involved in a case in Redhill County Court on 14 September 2016, when a Miss Abbas successfully defended a claim of circa £5,000 by Amigo Holdings on the basis that she never received a copy of the loan agreement.

== Ownership ==
Approximately 61.4% of the company was owned by Richmond Group, a business controlled by James Benamor, the founder. Benamor sold his complete shareholding in June and July 2020 after failing to change the composition of the Board of Directors.
