= Vanquis Banking Group =

British sub-prime lender

Vanquis Banking Group plc
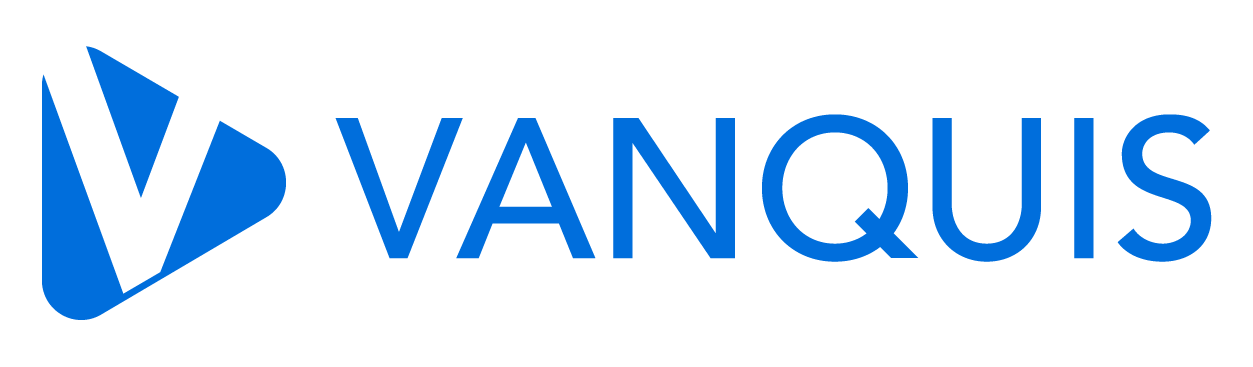
- Type: Public
- Traded as: LSE: VANQ
- Industry: Financial services
- Founded: 1880
- Headquarters: Bradford, England, UK
- Products: Credit cards Savings accounts Online loans Consumer car finance
- Revenue: ▲£454.9 million (2025)
- Operating income: ▲£8.3 million (2025)
- Net income: ▲£8.7 million (2025)
- Total assets: ▲£3,941.7 million (2025)
- Total equity: ▲£487.3 million (2025)
- Website: www.vanquisbankinggroup.com

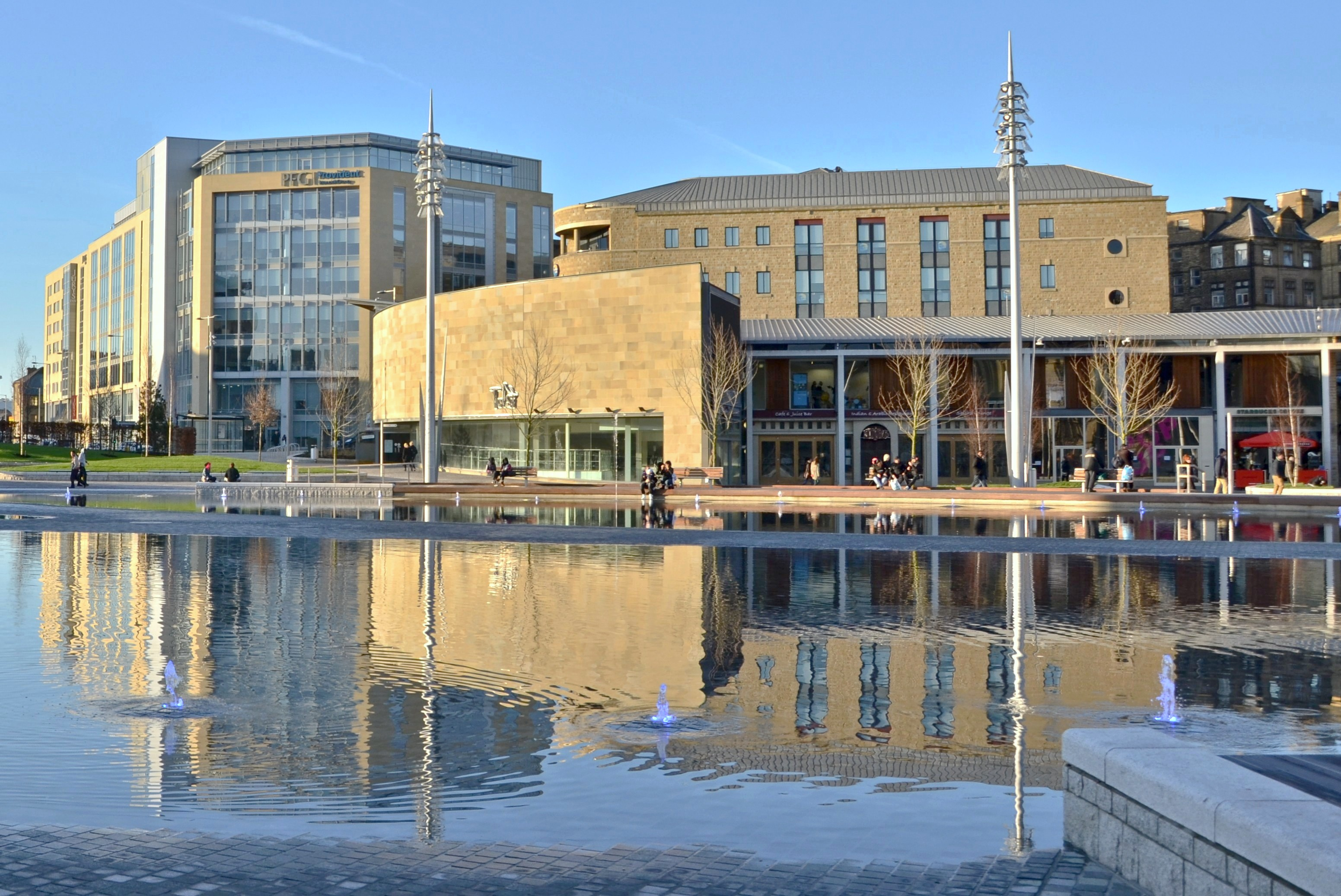
Registered Office, No. 1 Godwin Street, Bradford, England (the building on the left)

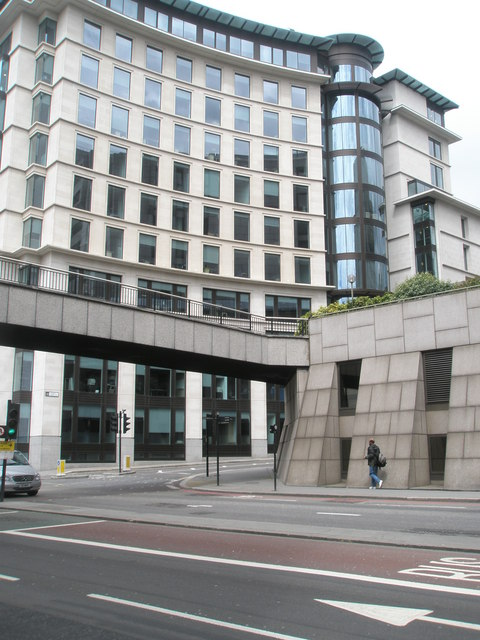
London Office at 12 Arthur Street

Vanquis Banking Group, formerly Provident Financial plc, is a British bank headquartered in Bradford, England which specialises in credit cards, loans and consumer vehicle finance. It primarily services customers with a sub-prime credit history who have been declined for credit from mainstream lenders. It also offers fixed-rate and notice savings accounts under the trading name Vanquis Savings. It is listed on the London Stock Exchange.

== History ==
The company was established in Bradford in 1880 by Joshua Kelley Waddilove to provide affordable credit to families in West Yorkshire as the Provident Clothing and Supply Company. The Company was first listed on the London Stock Exchange in 1962.

Provident Financial were one of the first financial institutions to enter into estate agency in the UK, establishing Whitegate Estate Agency in two cities 1978, and by the end of the year was operating in eight Yorkshire towns. The chain grew to 19 branches by the end of 1979, 22 branches by the end of 1980 and 23 branches by the end of 1982. Innovations brought to the market place included seven day opening, computerised mailing lists, a "No Sale – No Fee" guarantee and an all include fixed fee. By late 1985 there were 60 branches of the chain, expanding with a move into the East Midlands in 1986 to 70 branches (the 10 in the East Midlands were acquisitions which had trade during 1986 under their former names. As the chain reached its 10th anniversary towards the end of 1987, the chain totaled 95 branches of which 17 were franchised, rising to 107 branches (27 franchised) by the end of the following year. The chain was sold for £19 million in December 1989 to Legal & General.

In 2002, Provident Financial formed Vanquis Bank, with a full banking licence from the FSA, a consumer credit licence with the Office of Fair Trading and a licence from Visa International to operate and issue credit cards under the Visa brand. Vanquis Bank specialised in credit cards.

In 2005, Provident Financial closed its Yes Car Credit business, which had sold second-hand vehicles to customers with problematic credit histories. The company had been subject to bad publicity, including a TV investigation into its selling practices, pressurisation of staff, unreliable vehicles and debt collection methods. In 2007, it demerged its international business, and a new separate public company was formed called International Personal Finance. This company then held all of Provident Financial's ex-non-UK operations, with the exception of Ireland. It also sold the motor insurance business.

In 2013, Provident Financial launched its online short-term loan Satsuma Loans.

In 2014, Moneybarn was acquired by Provident Financial plc, joining the home credit and online credit businesses and Vanquis Bank to become the third leg of the group.

The Central Bank of Ireland in late 2014 fined and reprimanded Provident Financial for flagrant breaches of the regulatory requirements aimed at protecting Irish consumers. The five whistleblowers who reported the law breaking were then sacked by Provident, which led to the matter being raised in Dáil Éireann.

The crisis in Provident's home credit division stemmed from a restructuring implemented on 6 July 2017, which replaced approximately 4,500 self-employed collection agents with 2,500 full-time employees designated as Customer Experience Managers. The transition was accompanied by new routing and scheduling software, but many experienced agents did not make the transition to the employed model, and the technology proved error-prone. The home credit division's payment collection rate fell from 90% to 57%. On 22 August 2017, Provident issued its second profit warning in two months, reporting an expected loss of £80–120 million for the consumer credit division; chief executive Peter Crook resigned, Manjit Wolstenholme assumed the role of executive chairman, and the company cancelled its shareholder dividend. Provident lost two-thirds of its stock market value in a single day, with the share price falling from £32 in April 2017 to £8.50 by October. On 23 November 2017, Wolstenholme died suddenly aged 53, three months after taking on the executive role; Malcolm Le May, the senior independent director, was appointed interim executive chairman.

In February 2019, Non-Standard Finance (NSF), a consumer finance company founded by Provident's former chief executive and chairman John van Kuffeler, launched a hostile takeover bid valuing Provident at approximately £1.3 billion. NSF offered 8.88 new shares for each Provident share. The Provident board rejected the bid as "financially flawed", questioning NSF's ability to manage Vanquis Bank. Although investors holding approximately 50% of Provident's shares indicated support for the bid, the offer lapsed in June 2019 after the Prudential Regulation Authority concluded the merged group would not meet minimum regulatory capital requirements. Provident stated it "greatly regrets the unnecessary distraction, cost and impact of the uncertainty" caused by the bid.

In March 2021, Provident Financial announced that the Financial Conduct Authority had appointed investigators to examine its consumer credit division's practices between February 2020 and 2021, after the volume of affordability complaints had increased by 200% in the second half of 2020. Provident proposed a scheme of arrangement under which £50 million would be set aside for compensation payments for unresolved claims made before 17 December 2020, potentially affecting up to 4.2 million customers of its Provident, Satsuma, Glo and Greenwood brands. The FCA stated it did not support the scheme, citing concerns that customers were being offered significantly less than the full amount of redress owed, but did not formally oppose it in court on the grounds that the only likely alternative was insolvency, in which case customers would receive even less. The High Court approved the scheme on 4 August 2021.

In May 2021, Provident announced it would withdraw entirely from the home credit market, ending a business that had been at the core of its operations since its founding in 1880. The doorstep lending business ceased collecting payments and was closed on 31 December 2021, with outstanding loan balances written off.

In January 2023, it was announced that the company would be rebranded from "Provident Financial" to "Vanquis Banking Group". It changed its name accordingly on 2 March 2023.

In 2023, the firm acquired financial technology company Snoop, which provides a budget management application.

In 2025, Vanquis returned to profitability, reporting operating profit of £8.3 million after a £138 million loss the previous year. Chief executive Ian McLaughlin defended their decision to not pay a dividend for a second consecutive year, stating the bank's "number one priority" was getting back to capital generative trading.

In November 2026, John Natalizia was appointed chief executive, subject to regulatory approval, after Ian McLaughlin left the company and its board.

== Criticism ==
In 2011, Vanquis Bank was criticised for offering repayment option plans to their credit card customers, a form of insurance some consumer sites referred to as the 'new payment protection insurance (PPI)'. In 2012, the company was the subject of an episode of the BBC documentary series Panorama, which alleged that the company were breaching Office of Fair Trading guidelines by offering loans to vulnerable people who might not have understood the implications of the contracts they were entering into. The company were criticised by the Citizen's Advice Bureau, whose chief executive told Panorama, "I call into question...the motivation to keep exploiting people who clearly can't be held responsible for their own decisions in that situation."

In 2018, Vanquis Bank was fined £2 million for failing to properly disclose charges on one of its popular repayment plans. Vanquis was also forced to pay £169 million back in compensation to its customers.

In February 2020, the FCA fined Provident's car finance subsidiary Moneybarn £2.77 million for failing to treat customers fairly when they fell behind with loan repayments between April 2014 and October 2017. More than 1,400 customers, many of whom the FCA described as vulnerable, had defaulted after entering into unsustainable short-term repayment plans. Moneybarn voluntarily paid more than £30 million in redress to 5,933 affected customers.

On 8 September 2025 the UK Office of Financial Sanctions Implementation ("OFSI") issued a report concerning a breach of financial sanctions regulations by Vanquis Bank due to financial transactions with a designated person. The bank voluntarily declared it and was not fined.

== Operations ==
The main activity is the credit card business, Vanquis Bank, which was set up by Provident Financial in 2002. The customer services department moved to a new call centre in part of what used to be the Naval Dockyards at Chatham in 2008. Vanquis Bank offer a range of cards depending on the credit circumstances of the applicant.

In 2009 Vanquis rebranded, launched new credit cards and won the Credit Provider of the Year at the Credit Today Awards. In 2011, a further call centre was opened in Bradford, and a high-yield bond product was authorised by the FSA. Vanquis also began to operate in Poland using EU bank passporting rights in 2012.

In July 2024 the bank was forced to announce £40 million of write-downs and issued warnings over capital ratio targets.
