= Grind rail =

Skateboarding aid

A grind rail is a railing used by skateboarders, snowboarders, and skiers to do tricks, such as grinds and slides. They are usually square or round.

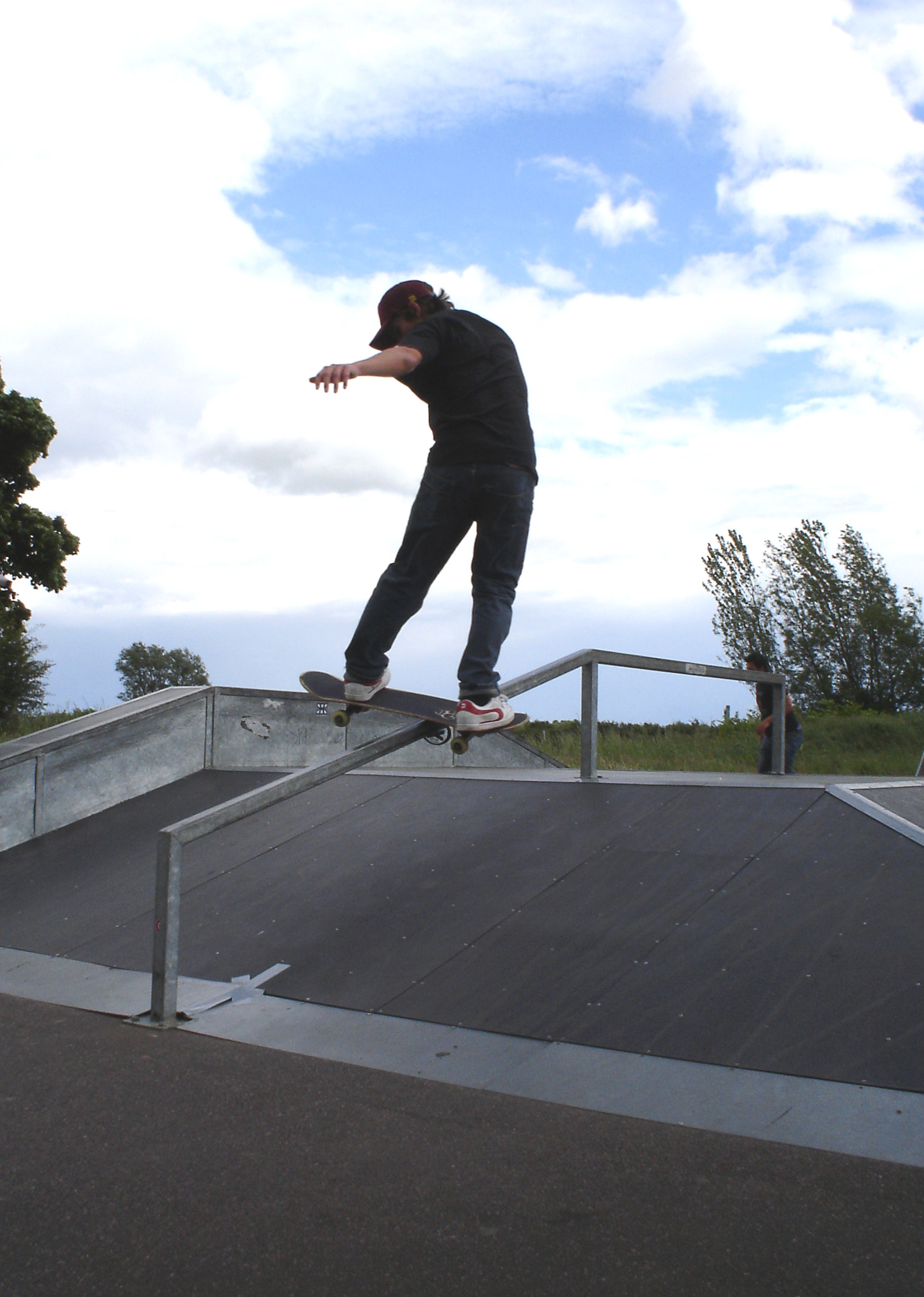
Grind rail used for skateboarding

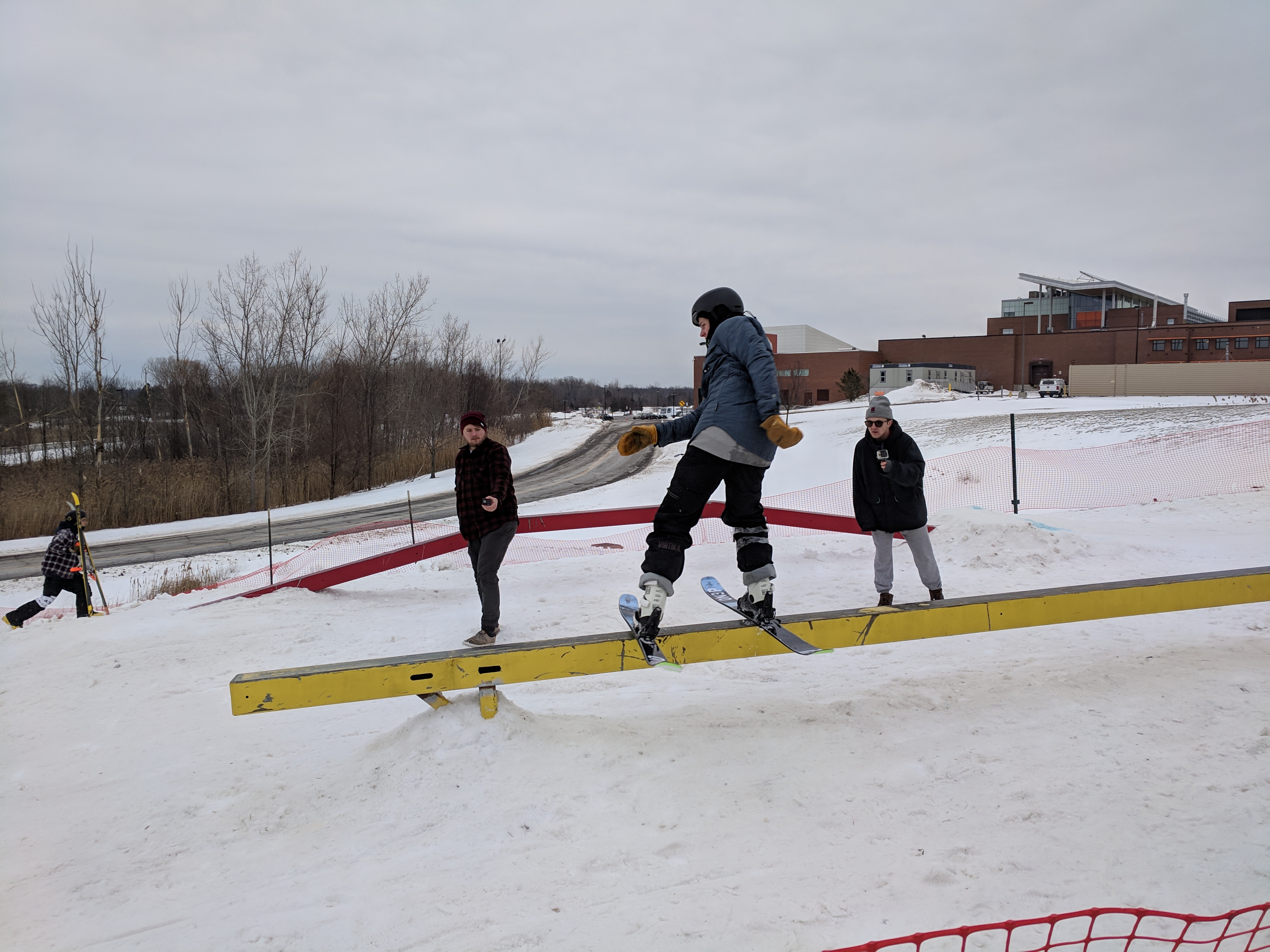
Flatbar used with skis

The two types of rails are:

- Handrail, a normal handrail on the sides (or the middle) of a stair.
- Flatbar, a flat rail located near the ground.

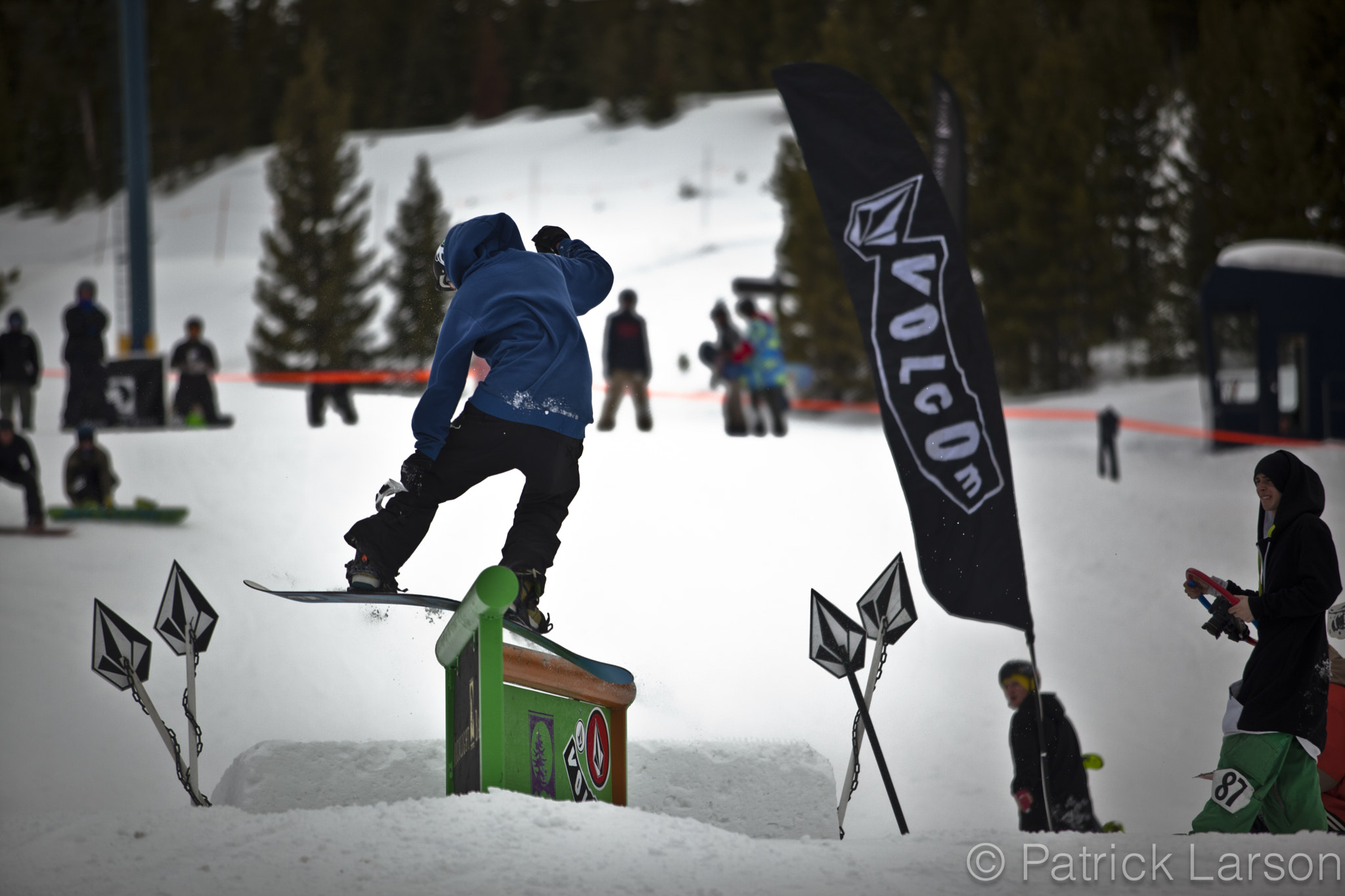
Grind rail used for snowboarding
