= Irrational exuberance (disambiguation) =

Irrational exuberance is a term used in 1996 by Alan Greenspan, then chairman of the U.S. Federal Reserve Board, with regards to equity prices in the United States.

Irrational exuberance may also refer to:

- Irrational Exuberance (book), by Robert Shiller, which expanded on the theme of Greenspan quote
- Irrational Exuberance (animutation), a Flash animutation of the song "Yatta" which features images of Greenspan
