= Irrational exuberance =

Unfounded market optimism that lacks fundamental valuation

"Irrational exuberance" is a phrase used by the then-Federal Reserve Board chairman, Alan Greenspan, in a December 1996 speech given at the American Enterprise Institute during the dot-com bubble of the 1990s. The phrase was interpreted as a warning that the stock market might be overvalued.

== Origin ==
Greenspan's comment was made during a televised speech on December 5, 1996 (emphasis added in excerpt):

Clearly, sustained low inflation implies less uncertainty about the future, and lower risk premiums imply higher prices of stocks and other earning assets. We can see that in the inverse relationship exhibited by price/earnings ratios and the rate of inflation in the past. But how do we know when irrational exuberance has unduly escalated asset values, which then become subject to unexpected and prolonged contractions as they have in Japan over the past decade?

— The Challenge of Central Banking in a Democratic Society, 1996-12-05

The Tokyo market was open during the speech and immediately moved down sharply after this comment, closing off 3%. Markets around the world followed.

Greenspan wrote in his 2008 book that the phrase occurred to him in the bathtub while he was writing a speech.

The irony of the phrase and its aftermath lies in Greenspan's widely held reputation as the most artful practitioner of Fedspeak, often known as Greenspeak, in the modern televised era. The speech coincided with the rise of dedicated financial TV channels around the world that would broadcast his comments live, such as CNBC. Greenspan's idea was to obfuscate his true opinion in long complex sentences with obscure words so as to intentionally mute any strong market response.

The phrase was also used by Yale professor Robert J. Shiller, who was reportedly Greenspan's source for the phrase. Shiller used it as the title of his book, Irrational Exuberance, first published in 2000, where Shiller states:

Irrational exuberance is the psychological basis of a speculative bubble. I define a speculative bubble as a situation in which news of price increases spurs investor enthusiasm, which spreads by psychological contagion from person to person, in the process amplifying stories that might justify the price increases, and bringing in a larger and larger class of investors who, despite doubts about the real value of an investment, are drawn to it partly by envy of others' successes and partly through a gamblers' excitement.

Shiller is associated with the CAPE ratio and the Case–Shiller Home Price Index popularized during the housing bubble of 2004–2007. He is frequently asked during interviews whether markets are irrationally exuberant as asset prices rise. There was some speculation for many years whether Greenspan borrowed the phrase from Shiller without attribution, although Shiller later wrote that he contributed "irrational" at a lunch with Greenspan before the speech but "exuberant" was a previous Greenspan term and it was Greenspan who coined the phrase and not a speech writer.

== Continued use ==
By the mid-to-late 2000s the dot-com losses were recouped and eclipsed by a combination of events, including the 2000s commodities boom and the United States housing bubble. However, the recession of 2007 onward wiped out these gains. The second market slump brought the phrase back into the public eye, where it was much used in hindsight, to characterize the excesses of the bygone era. In 2006, upon Greenspan's retirement from the Federal Reserve Board, The Daily Show with Jon Stewart held a full-length farewell show in his honor, named An Irrationally Exuberant Tribute to Alan Greenspan.

This combination of events caused the phrase at present to be most often associated with the 1990s dot-com bubble and the 2000s US housing bubble although it can be linked to any financial asset bubble or social frenzy phenomena, such as the tulip mania of 17th century Holland.

The phrase is often cited in conjunction with criticism of Greenspan's policies and debate whether he did enough to contain the two major bubbles of those two decades. It is also used in arguments about whether capitalist free markets are rational.

In 2017, Robert J. Shiller, Nobel Prize Laureate and author of the seminal book Irrational Exuberance, called Bitcoin the best current example of a speculative bubble.

== See also ==
- Dot-com bubble
- Extraordinary Popular Delusions and the Madness of Crowds
- Fedspeak
- Fear of missing out
- Stock market bubble
- United States housing bubble
