= Behavioural finance =

How psychological biases shape investor behaviour and financial markets

Behavioural finance is the study of the influence of psychology on the behaviour of investors or financial analysts. It assumes that investors are not always rational, have limits to their self-control and are influenced by their own biases.

For example, behavioural law and economics scholars studying the growth of financial firms' technological capabilities have attributed decision science to irrational consumer decisions. It also includes the subsequent effects on the markets. Behavioral Finance attempts to explain the reasoning patterns of investors and measures the influential power of these patterns on the investor's decision making. The central issue in behavioural finance is explaining why market participants make irrational systematic errors contrary to assumption of rational market participants. Such errors affect prices and returns, creating market inefficiencies.

== History ==
=== Traditional finance ===
The accepted theories of finance are referred to as traditional finance. The foundation of traditional finance is associated with the modern portfolio theory (MPT) and the efficient-market hypothesis (EMH). Modern portfolio theory is based on a stock or portfolio's expected return, standard deviation, and its correlation with the other assets held within the portfolio. With these three concepts, an efficient portfolio can be created for any group of assets. An efficient portfolio is a group of assets that has the maximum expected return given the amount of risk. The efficient-market hypothesis states that all public information is already reflected in a security's price. The proponents of the traditional theories believe that "investors should just own the entire market rather than attempting to outperform the market". Behavioral finance has emerged as an alternative to these theories of traditional finance and the behavioural aspects of psychology and sociology are integral catalysts within this field of study.

=== Evolution ===
The foundations of behavioural finance can be traced back over 150 years. Several original books written in the 1800s and early 1900s marked the beginning of the behavioural finance school. Originally published in 1841, MacKay's Extraordinary Popular Delusions and the Madness of Crowds presents a chronological timeline of the various panics and schemes throughout history. This work shows how group behaviour applies to the financial markets of today. Le Bon's important work, The Crowd: A Study of the Popular Mind, discusses the role of "crowds" (also known as crowd psychology) and group behaviour as they apply to the fields of behavioural finance, social psychology, sociology and history. Selden's 1912 book Psychology of The Stock Market applies the field of psychology directly to the stock market and discusses the emotional and psychological forces at work on investors and traders in the financial markets. These three works along with several others form the foundation of applying psychology and sociology to the field of finance. The foundation of behavioural finance is an area based on an interdisciplinary approach including scholars from the social sciences and business schools. From the liberal arts perspective, this includes the fields of psychology, sociology, anthropology, economics and behavioural economics. On the business administration side, this covers areas such as management, marketing, finance, technology and accounting.

Critics contend that behavioural finance is more a collection of anomalies than a true branch of finance and that these anomalies are either quickly priced out of the market or explained by appealing to market microstructure arguments. However, individual cognitive biases are distinct from social biases; the former can be averaged out by the market, while the other can create positive feedback loops that drive the market further and further from a "fair price" equilibrium. It is observed that, the problem with the general area of behavioural finance is that it only serves as a complement to general economics. Similarly, for an anomaly to violate market efficiency, an investor must be able to trade against it and earn abnormal profits; this is not the case for many anomalies. A specific example of this criticism appears in some explanations of the equity premium puzzle. It is argued that the cause is entry barriers (both practical and psychological) and that the equity premium should reduce as electronic resources open up the stock market to more traders. In response, others contend that most personal investment funds are managed through superannuation funds, minimising the effect of these putative entry barriers. In addition, professional investors and fund managers seem to hold more bonds than one would expect given return differentials.

== Quantitative behavioural finance ==
Quantitative behavioural finance uses mathematical and statistical methodology to understand behavioural biases. Some financial models used in money management and asset valuation, as well as more theoretical models, likewise, incorporate behavioural finance parameters. Examples:

- Thaler's model of price reactions to information, with three phases (underreaction, adjustment, and overreaction), creating a price trend. Here, as an example, one characteristic of overreaction is that average returns following announcements of good news is lower than following bad news. In other words, overreaction occurs if the market reacts too strongly or for too long to news, thus requiring an adjustment in the opposite direction. As a result, outperforming assets in one period is likely to underperform in the following period. This also applies to customers' irrational purchasing habits.
- An artificial financial market allows the researcher to make inferences re market dynamics, or to test related structural or policy changes. Here, an agent-based model is developed where simulated trade occurs between numerous (heterogenous) "agents", using artificial intelligence to represent the adaptive behaviour of these market participants.
- Market microstructure is concerned with the details of how exchange occurs in markets, and "analyzes how specific trading mechanisms affect the price formation process", examining the ways in which the processes of a market affect determinants of transaction costs, prices, quotes, volume, and trading behaviour.

Quantitative behavioural finance is a new discipline that uses mathematical and statistical methodology to understand behavioural biases in conjunction with valuation.

The research can be grouped into the following areas:

1. Empirical studies that demonstrate significant deviations from classical theories.
2. Modelling using the concepts of behavioural effects together with the non-classical assumption of the finiteness of assets.
3. Forecasting based on these methods.
4. Studies of experimental asset markets and use of models to forecast experiments.

=== History ===
The prevalent theory of financial markets during the second half of the 20th century has been the efficient market hypothesis (EMH) which states that all public information is incorporated into asset prices. Any deviation from this true price is quickly exploited by informed traders who attempt to optimise their returns and it restores the true equilibrium price. For all practical purposes, then, market prices behave as though all traders were pursuing their self-interest with complete information and rationality.

Toward the end of the 20th century, this theory was challenged in several ways. First, there were a number of large market events that cast doubt on the basic assumptions. On 19 October 1987 the Dow Jones average plunged over 20% in a single day, as many smaller stocks suffered deeper losses. The large oscillations on the ensuing days provided a graph that resembled the famous crash of 1929. The crash of 1987 provided a puzzle and challenge to most economists who had believed that such volatility should not exist in an age when information and capital flows are much more efficient than they were in the 1920s.

As the decade continued, the Japanese market soared to heights far removed from any realistic assessment of valuations. Price-earnings ratios climbed into triple digits, and Nippon Telephone and Telegraph achieved a market valuation (stock market price times the number of shares) that exceeded the entire market capitalisation of West Germany. In early 1990, the Nikkei index stood at 40,000, having nearly doubled in two years. In less than a year, the Nikkei dropped to nearly half its peak.

Meanwhile, in the US, the growth of new technology—particularly the internet—spawned a new generation of high-tech companies, some of which became publicly traded long before earning any profits. As in the Japanese stock market bubble a decade earlier, these stocks soared to market valuations of billions of dollars, sometimes before they even had revenue. The bubble continued into 2000, and the subsequent bust reduced many of these stocks to a few percent of their prior market value. Even some large and profitable tech companies lost 80% of their value during the period from 2000 to 2003.

These large bubbles and crashes in the absence of significant changes in valuation cast doubt on the assumption of efficient markets that incorporate all public information accurately. In his book, “Irrational Exuberance”, Robert Shiller discusses the excesses that have plagued markets, and concludes that stock prices move in excess of changes in valuation. This line of reasoning has also been confirmed in several studies (e.g., Jeffrey Pontiff), of closed-end funds which trade like stocks, but have a precise valuation that is reported frequently. (See Seth Anderson and Jeffrey Born “Closed-end Fund Pricing” for review of papers relating to these issues.)

In addition to these world developments, other challenges to classical economics and EMH came from the new field of experimental economics pioneered by Vernon L. Smith who won the 2002 Nobel Prize in Economics. These experiments (in collaboration with Gerry Suchanek, Arlington Williams and David Porter and others) featured participants trading an asset defined by the experimenters on a network of computers. A series of experiments involved a single asset which pays a fixed dividend during each of 15 periods and then becomes worthless. Contrary to the expectations of classical economics, trading prices often soar to levels much higher than the expected payout. Similarly, other experiments showed that many of the expected results of classical economics and game theory are not borne out in experiments. A key part of these experiments is that participants earn real money as a consequence of their trading decisions, so that the experiment is an actual market rather than a survey of opinion.

Behavioral finance is a field that has grown during the past two decades in part as a reaction to the phenomena described above. Using a variety of methods researchers have documented systematic biases (e.g., underreaction, overreaction, etc.) that occur among professional investors as well as novices. Behavioral finance researchers generally do not subscribe to EMH as a consequence of these biases. However, EMH theorists counter that while EMH makes a precise prediction about a market based upon the data, BF usually does not go beyond saying that EMH is wrong.

=== Research ===
The attempt to quantify basic biases and to use them in mathematical models is the subject of Quantitative Behavioral Finance. Caginalp and collaborators have used both statistical and mathematical methods on both the world market data and experimental economics data in order to make quantitative predictions. In a series of papers dating back to 1989, Caginalp and collaborators have studied asset market dynamics using differential equations that incorporate strategies and biases of investors such as the price trend and valuation within a system that has finite cash and asset. This feature is distinct from classical finance in which there is the assumption of infinite arbitrage.

One of the predictions of this theory by Caginalp and Balenovich (1999) was that a larger supply of cash per share would result in a larger bubble. Experiments by Caginalp, Porter and Smith (1998) confirmed that doubling the level of cash, for example, while maintaining constant number of shares essentially doubles the magnitude of the bubble.

Using the differential equations to predict experimental markets as they evolved also proved successful, as the equations were approximately as accurate as human forecasters who had been selected as the best traders of previous experiments (Caginalp, Porter and Smith).

The challenge of using these ideas to forecast price dynamics in financial markets has been the focus of some of the recent work that has merged two different mathematical methods. The differential equations can be used in conjunction with statistical methods to provide short term forecasts.

One of the difficulties in understanding the dynamics of financial markets has been the presence of “noise” (Fischer Black). Random world events are always making changes in valuations that are difficult to extract from any deterministic forces that may be present. Consequently, many statistical studies have only shown a negligible non-random component. For example, Poterba and Summers demonstrate a tiny trend effect in stock prices. White showed that using neural networks with 500 days of IBM stock was unsuccessful in terms of short term forecasts.

In both of these examples, the level of “noise” or changes in valuation apparently exceeds any possible behavioural effects. A methodology that avoids this pitfall has been developed during the past decade. If one can subtract out the valuation as it varies in time, one can study the remaining behavioural effects, if any. An early study along these lines (Caginalp and Greg Consantine) studied the ratio of two clone closed-end funds. Since these funds had the same portfolio but traded independently, the ratio is independent of valuation. A statistical time series study showed that this ratio was highly non-random, and that the best predictor of tomorrow’s price is not today’s price (as suggested by EMH) but halfway between the price and the price trend.

The subject of overreactions has also been important in behavioural finance. In his 2006 PhD thesis, Duran examined 130,000 data points of daily prices for closed-end funds in terms of their deviation from the net asset value (NAV). Funds exhibiting a large deviation from NAV were likely to behave in the opposite direction of the subsequent day. Even more interesting was the statistical observation that a large deviation in the opposite direction preceded such large deviations. These precursors may suggest that an underlying cause of these large moves—in the absence of significant change in valuation—may be due to the positioning of traders in advance of anticipated news. For example, suppose many traders are anticipating positive news and buy the stock. If the positive news does not materialise they are inclined to sell in large numbers, thereby suppressing the price significantly below the previous levels. This interpretation is inconsistent with EMH but is consistent with asset flow differential equations (AFDE) that incorporate behavioural concepts with the finiteness of assets. Research continues on efforts to optimise the parameters of the asset flow equations in order to forecast near term prices (see Duran and Caginalp).

It is important to classify the behaviour of solutions for the dynamical system of nonlinear differential equations. Duran studied the stability analysis of the solutions for the dynamical system of nonlinear AFDEs in R^4, in three versions, analytically and numerically. He found the existence of the infinitely many fixed points (equilibrium points) for the first two versions. He concluded that these versions of AFDEs are structurally unstable systems mathematically by using an extension of the Peixoto Theorem for two-dimensional manifolds to a four-dimensional manifold. Moreover, he obtained that there is no critical point (equilibrium point) if the chronic discount over the past finite time interval is nonzero for the third version of AFDEs.

== Research in the news ==
- NY Times Article
- Pittsburgh Tribune-Review Article
