= Dot plot =

Dot plot may refer to:

- Dot plot (bioinformatics), for comparing two sequences
- Dot plot (statistics), data points on a simple scale
- Dot plot graphic for Federal Reserve Open Market Committee polling result
