= Lawrence Yun =

American economist

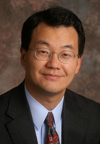
- Born: Suncheon, South Korea
- Education: Purdue University (BS); University of Maryland, College Park (MA, PhD)

Lawrence Yun is a Chief Economist and Senior Vice President of Research at the National Association of Realtors.

== Early life ==
Yun was born in Suncheon, South Jeolla Province, South Korea. While Yun was a child, his family moved to Columbia, South Carolina.

== Education ==
In 1987, Yun earned a Bachelor of Science degree in Mechanical Engineering from Purdue University. In 1995, Yun earned a PhD degree in economics from University of Maryland, College Park.

== Career ==
In 1999, Yun was an economic consultant to the U.S. Dept. of Veterans Affairs and U.S. Dept. of Education.

In 2000, Yun joined the National Association of Realtors (NAR) as a junior economist. In 2007, Yun became the chief economist and senior vice president of research at National Association of Realtors. Yun oversees the production of existing home sales statistics and the popular Home Buyer and Home Seller survey reports. He regularly appears on CNBC, BBC, Bloomberg Television, and is often quoted in the media. As was his predecessor David Lereah at the NAR, Yun has been criticized for his overly optimistic predictions on the housing market.

Yun is also a frequent speaker at Real Estate conferences throughout the United States. In March 2008, USA Today listed him among the top 10 economic forecasters in the country. At the time, when most economists were calling for another major declines in the housing market, Yun predicted that the housing market could stabilize with a home buyer tax credit. Yun had indicated that 2009 was a good time to buy given the continued population growth. The median home price in 2009 was $172,100, while the bottom was set in 2011 at $166,200. But given that today’s median home price is above $400,000, those that bought homes in 2009 would have come out quite well.

Yun appears regularly on financial news outlets, is a frequent speaker at real estate conferences throughout the United States. Yun appears often as a guest on CSPAN's Washington Journal and is a regular guest columnist on the Forbes online.

In March 2012, Yun testified as a chief economist before Congress' sub-committee hearing.

In 2025, the Wall Street Journal congratulated him for having one of the closest forecasts for 2024.

While a research associate at the University of Maryland from 1995 to 1998 with the funding from the United States Agency for International Development, Yun helped develop a graduate economics curriculum and lectured at several universities in the former Soviet Union as that country transitioned from communism to a market-based economy.

== Personal life ==
Yun's wife is Alla. They have one son. Yun resides in Arlington, Virginia.

== See also ==
- Dennis Mueller
- Mancur Olson
