= Macro Markets =

1993 economics book by Robert Shiller

- Title page for Macro Markets (1993) signed by the author
- Author: Robert Shiller
- Genre: Finance
- Publisher: Clarendon Press
- Publication date: 1993
- ISBN: 0198294182

Macro Markets (ISBN 0198294182) is a book by Robert Shiller. It was published in 1993 by the Clarendon Press imprint of the Oxford University Press. It suggests that humans cannot fully diversify away their risk as portfolio theory would like us to. This is because there are missing markets, such as the general geographically computational risk of living in a certain area. The book envisions completing endowment markets by providing tradable risk factors.
