= Robert J. Shiller =

American Lithuanian economist (born 1946)

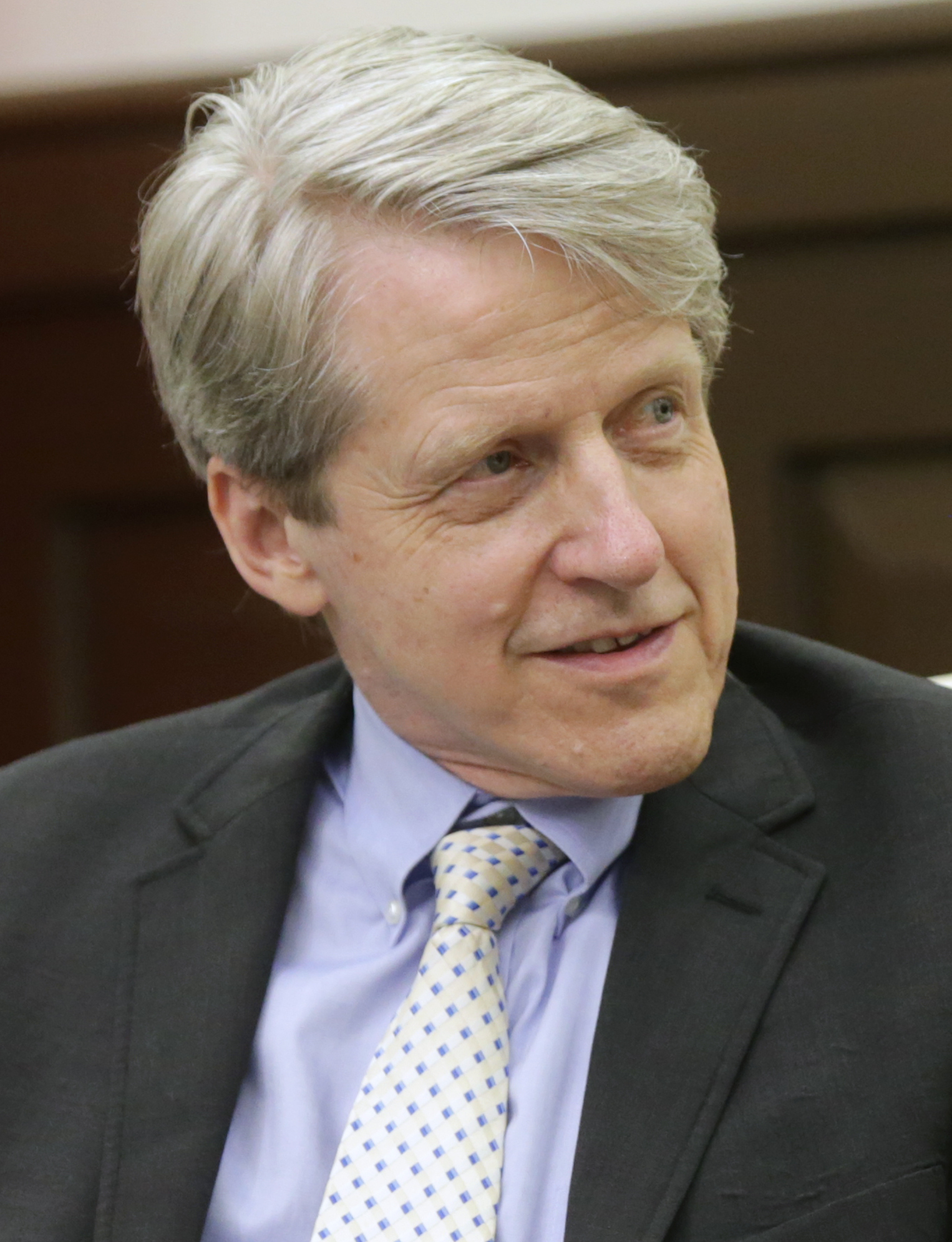
- Shiller in July 2017
- Born: Robert James Shiller; March 29, 1946 (age 80); Detroit, Michigan, U.S.

Academic background
- Education: Kalamazoo College; University of Michigan (BA); Massachusetts Institute of Technology (SM, PhD)
- Thesis: Rational expectations and the structure of interest rates (1972)
- Doctoral advisor: Franco Modigliani
- Influences: John Maynard Keynes; George Akerlof; Irving Fisher

Academic work
- Discipline: Financial economics Behavioral finance
- School or tradition: New Keynesian economics Behavioral economics
- Institutions: Yale University
- Doctoral students: John Y. Campbell
- Notable ideas: Irrational Exuberance, Case-Shiller index, CAPE-ratio
- Awards: Deutsche Bank Prize (2009) Nobel Memorial Prize in Economics (2013)
- Website: Information at IDEAS / RePEc

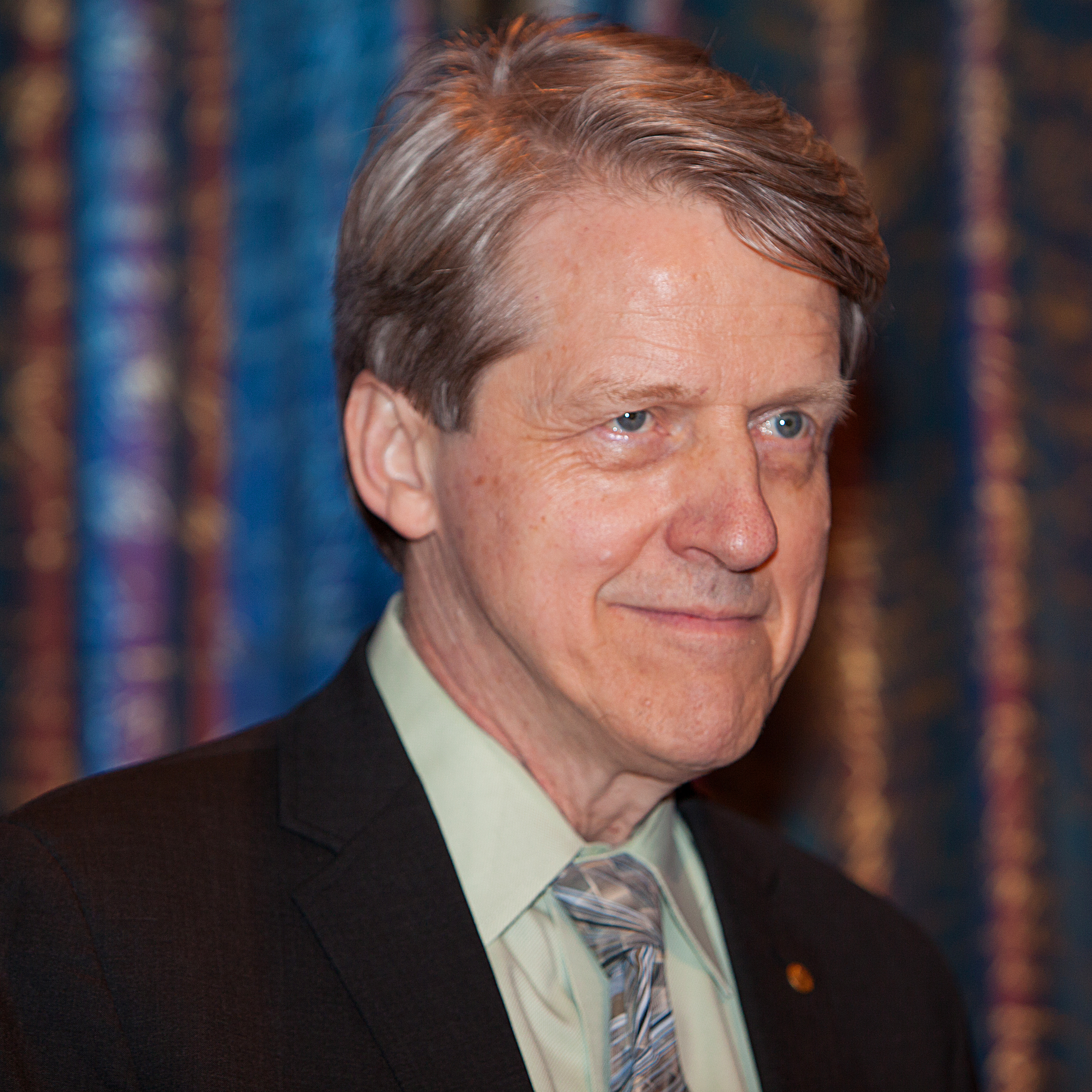
Nobel Memorial Prize Laureate Robert J. Shiller during press conference in Stockholm, December 2013

Robert James Shiller (born March 29, 1946) is an American economist, academic, and author. As of 2022, he served as a Sterling Professor of Economics at Yale University and is a fellow at the Yale School of Management's International Center for Finance. Shiller has been a research associate of the National Bureau of Economic Research (NBER) since 1980, was vice president of the American Economic Association in 2005, its president for 2016, and president of the Eastern Economic Association for 2006–2007. He is also the co‑founder and chief economist of the investment management firm MacroMarkets LLC.

Shiller is known for four major intellectual contributions: co-developing the Case–Shiller housing price index with Karl Case, as well as the cyclically adjusted price-to-earnings ratio; challenging the Efficient Market Hypothesis; and warning years in advance of the stock market and housing bubble that would become the subprime mortgage crisis.

Shiller was ranked by the IDEAS RePEc publications monitor in 2008 as among the 100 most influential economists of the world; and was still on the list in 2019. Eugene Fama, Lars Peter Hansen and Shiller jointly received the 2013 Nobel Memorial Prize in Economic Sciences, "for their empirical analysis of asset prices".

== Background ==
Shiller was born in Detroit, Michigan, the son of Ruth R. (née Radsville) and Benjamin Peter Shiller, an engineer-cum-entrepreneur. He is of Lithuanian descent. He is married to Virginia Marie (Faulstich), a psychologist, and has two children. He was raised as a Methodist.

Shiller attended Kalamazoo College for two years before transferring to the University of Michigan where he graduated Phi Beta Kappa with a B.A. degree in 1967. He received the S.M. degree from the Massachusetts Institute of Technology (MIT) in 1968, and his Ph.D. from MIT in 1972 with thesis entitled Rational expectations and the structure of interest rates under the supervision of Franco Modigliani.

== Career and views ==
Shiller has taught at Yale since 1982, and previously held faculty positions at the Wharton School of the University of Pennsylvania and the University of Minnesota, also giving frequent lectures at the London School of Economics. He has written on economic topics that range from behavioral finance to real estate to risk management, and has been co-organizer of the NBER workshops on behavioral finance with Richard Thaler from 1991 to 2015. His book Macro Markets won TIAA-CREF's first annual Paul A. Samuelson Award. He publishes a syndicated column and has been a regular contributor to Project Syndicate since 2003.

In 1981 Shiller published an article in which he challenged the efficient-market hypothesis, which was the dominant view in the economics profession at the time. Shiller argued that in a rational stock market, investors would base stock prices on the expected receipt of future dividends, discounted to a present value. He examined the performance of the U.S. stock market since the 1920s, and considered the kinds of expectations of future dividends and discount rates that could justify the wide range of variation experienced in the stock market. Shiller concluded that the volatility of the stock market was greater than could plausibly be explained by any rational view of the future. This finding became known as the excess volatility puzzle. This article was later named as one of the "top 20" articles in the 100-year history of the American Economic Association.

The behavioral finance school gained new credibility following the October 1987 stock market crash. Shiller's work included survey research that asked investors and stock traders what motivated them to make trades; the results further bolstered his hypothesis that these decisions are often driven by emotion instead of rational calculation. Much of this survey data has been gathered continuously since 1989.

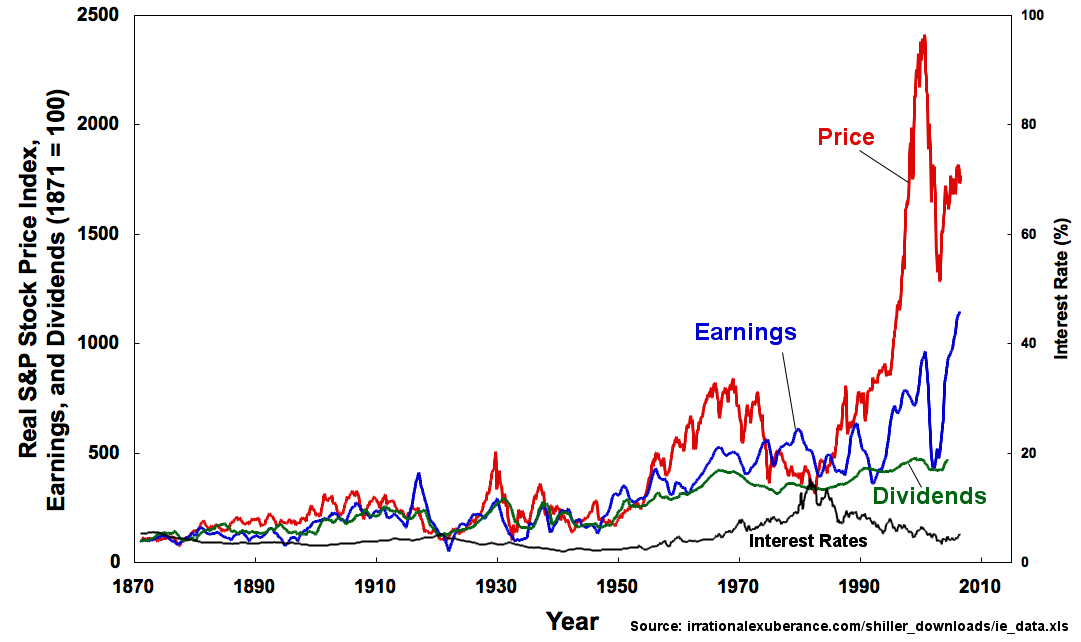
Robert Shiller's plot of the S&P Composite Real Price Index, Earnings, Dividends, and Interest Rates, from Irrational Exuberance, 2d ed. In the preface to this edition, Shiller warns that "[t]he stock market has not come down to historical levels: the price-earnings ratio as I define it in this book is still, at this writing [2005], in the mid‑20s, far higher than the historical average. ... People still place too much confidence in the markets and have too strong a belief that paying attention to the gyrations in their investments will someday make them rich, and so they do not make conservative preparations for possible bad outcomes."

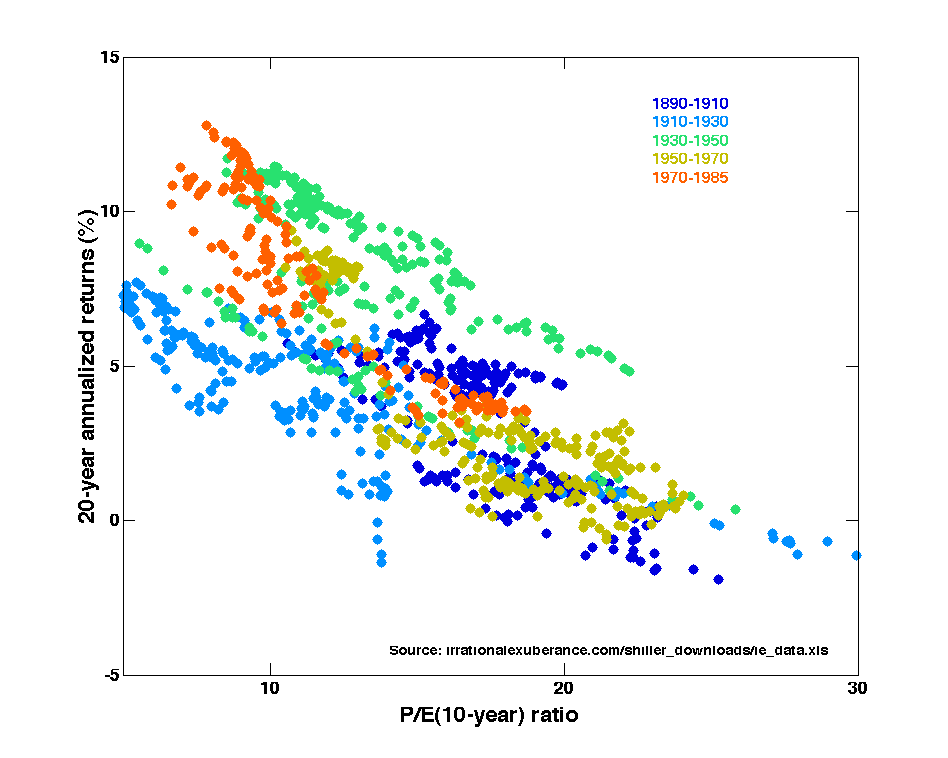
Price-earnings ratios as a predictor of twenty-year returns based on the plot by Robert Shiller (Figure 10.1,). The horizontal axis shows the Cyclically adjusted Price-Earnings (CAPE) ratio of the S&P Composite Stock Price Index as computed in Irrational Exuberance (inflation adjusted price divided by the prior ten-year mean of inflation-adjusted earnings). The vertical axis shows the geometric average real annual return on investing in the S&P Composite Stock Price Index, reinvesting dividends, and selling twenty years later. Data from different twenty-year periods is color-coded as shown in the key. See also ten-year returns. Shiller states that this plot "confirms that long-term investors – investors who commit their money to an investment for ten full years – did do well when prices were low relative to earnings at the beginning of the ten years. Long-term investors would be well advised, individually, to lower their exposure to the stock market when it is high, as it has been recently, and get into the market when it is low."

In 1991 he formed Case Shiller Weiss with economists Karl Case and Allan Weiss who served as the CEO from inception to the sale to Fiserv. The company produced a repeat-sales index using home sales price data from across the nation, studying home pricing trends. The index was developed by Shiller and Case when Case was studying unsustainable house pricing booms in Boston and Shiller was studying the behavioral aspects of economic bubbles. The repeat-sales index developed by Case and Shiller was later acquired and further developed by Fiserv and Standard & Poor, creating the Case-Shiller index.

His book Irrational Exuberance (2000) – a New York Times bestseller – warned that the stock market had become a bubble in March 2000 (the very height of the market top), which could lead to a sharp decline.

On CNBC's "How to Profit from the Real Estate Boom" in 2005, he noted that housing price rises could not outstrip inflation in the long term because, except for land restricted sites, house prices would tend toward building costs plus normal economic profit. Co‑panelist David Lereah disagreed. In February, Lereah had put out his book Are You Missing the Real Estate Boom? signaling the market top for housing prices. While Shiller repeated his precise timing again for another market bubble, because the general level of nationwide residential real estate prices do not reveal themselves until after a lag of about one year, people did not believe Shiller had called another top until late 2006 and early 2007.

Shiller was elected to the American Philosophical Society in 2003.

That same year, he co-authored a Brookings Institution paper entitled "Is There a Bubble in the Housing Market?" Shiller subsequently refined his position in the 2nd edition of Irrational Exuberance (2005), acknowledging that "further rises in the [stock and housing] markets could lead, eventually, to even more significant declines... A long-run consequence could be a decline in consumer and business confidence, and another, possibly worldwide, recession. This extreme outcome ... is not inevitable, but it is a much more serious risk than is widely acknowledged." Writing in The Wall Street Journal in August 2006, Shiller again warned that "there is significant risk of a very bad period, with slow sales, slim commissions, falling prices, rising default and foreclosures, serious trouble in financial markets, and a possible recession sooner than most of us expected." In September 2007, almost exactly one year before the collapse of Lehman Brothers, Shiller wrote an article in which he predicted an imminent collapse in the U.S. housing market, and subsequent financial panic.

Shiller was awarded the Deutsche Bank Prize in Financial Economics in 2009 for his pioneering research in the field of financial economics, relating to the dynamics of asset prices, such as fixed income, equities, and real estate, and their metrics. His work has been influential in the development of the theory as well as its implications for practice and policy making. His contributions on risk sharing, financial market volatility, bubbles and crises, have received widespread attention among academics, practitioners, and policymakers alike. In 2010, he was named by Foreign Policy magazine to its list of top global thinkers.

In 2010 Shiller supported the idea that to fix the financial and banking systems, in order to avoid future financial crisis, banks need to issue a new kind of debt, known as contingent capital, that automatically converts into equity if the regulators determine that there is a systemic national financial crisis, and if the bank is simultaneously in violation of capital-adequacy.

In 2011 he attained the Bloomberg 50 most influential people in global finance ranking list. In 2012, Thomson Reuters named him a contender for that year's Nobel Prize in Economics, citing his "pioneering contributions to financial market volatility and the dynamics of asset prices".

On October 14, 2013, it was announced that Shiller had received the 2013 Nobel Prize in Economics alongside Eugene Fama and Lars Peter Hansen.

His lecture at the prize ceremony explained why markets are not efficient. He presented an argument on why Eugene Fama's Efficient Market Hypothesis (EMH) was fallacious. EMH postulates that the present value of an asset reflects the efficient incorporation of information into prices. According to Shiller, the results of the movement of the market are extremely erratic, unlike Fama's assertion where the movement would be smoother if it would reflect the intrinsic value of the assets: the "excess volatility puzzle". The results of the graphs provided by Shiller showed a clear aberration from that of the Efficient Market Hypothesis. For example, the dividend growth had been 2% per year on stocks. However, it contradicted the EMH since the growth did not reflect the expected dividends. It is further explained by Shiller's Linearized Present Value model, which is a result of collaboration with his colleague and former student John Campbell, that only one-half to one-third of the fluctuations in the stock market are explained by the expected dividends model. Also, in the lecture, Shiller pointed out that variables such as interest rates and building costs did not explain the movement of the housing market.

On the other hand, Shiller believes that more information regarding the asset market is crucial for its efficiency. Additionally, he alluded to John Maynard Keynes's explanation of stock markets to point out the irrationality of people while making decisions. Keynes compared the stock market to a beauty contest where people instead of betting on who they find attractive, bet on the contestant who the majority of people find attractive. Therefore, he believes that people do not use complicated mathematical calculations and a sophisticated economic model while participating in the asset market. He argued that a huge set of data is required for the market to operate efficiently. Since there were very minuscule data available on the asset markets for his research, let alone for the common people, he developed the Case-Shiller index that provides information about the trends in home prices. Thus, he added that the use of modern technology can benefit economists to accrue data of broader asset classes that will make the market more information-based and the prices more efficient.

In interviews in June 2015, Shiller warned of the potential of a stock market crash. In August 2015, after a flash crash in individual stocks, he continued to see bubbly conditions in stocks, bonds and housing.

In 2015, the Council for Economic Education honored Shiller with its Visionary Award.

In 2017, Shiller was quoted as calling Bitcoin the biggest financial bubble at the time. The perceived failure of the Cincinnati Time Store has been used as an analogy to suggest that cryptocurrencies like Bitcoin are a "speculative bubble" waiting to burst, according to Shiller.

In 2019, Shiller published Narrative Economics. The book received favourable reviews and was selected among the Best books of 2019 list published by the Financial Times.

In June 2024, 16 Nobel Prize in Economics laureates, including Shiller, signed an open letter arguing that Donald Trump’s fiscal and trade policies coupled with efforts to limit the Federal Reserve's independence would reignite inflation in the United States.

== Works ==
=== Books ===
- Narrative Economics: How Stories Go Viral and Drive Major Economic Events, Robert J. Shiller, Princeton University Press (2019), ISBN 978-0691182292.
- Phishing for Phools: The Economics of Manipulation and Deception, George A. Akerlof and Robert J. Shiller, Princeton University Press (2015), ISBN 978-0-691-16831-9.
- Finance and the Good Society, Robert J. Shiller, Princeton University Press (2012), ISBN 0-691-15488-0.
- Animal Spirits: How Human Psychology Drives the Economy, and Why It Matters for Global Capitalism, George A. Akerlof and Robert J. Shiller, Princeton University Press (2009), ISBN 978-0-691-14233-3.
- The Subprime Solution: How Today's Global Financial Crisis Happened, and What to Do about It, Robert J. Shiller, Princeton University Press (2008), ISBN 0-691-13929-6.
- The New Financial Order: Risk in the 21st Century, Robert J. Shiller, Princeton University Press (2003), ISBN 0-691-09172-2.
- Irrational Exuberance, Robert J Shiller, Princeton University Press (2000), ISBN 0-691-05062-7.
- Macro Markets: Creating Institutions for Managing Society's largest Economic Risks, Robert J. Shiller, Clarendon Press, New York: Oxford University Press (1993), ISBN 0-19-828782-8.
- Market Volatility, Robert J. Shiller, MIT Press (1990), ISBN 0-262-19290-X.

=== Op-eds ===
Shiller has written op-eds since at least 2007 for such publications as The New York Times, where he has appeared in print on at least two dozen occasions.

- In "The Transformation of the American Dream", Shiller starts his history lesson on the evolution of language in 1931 with James Truslow Adams's "dream of... opportunity for each according to his ability or achievement", through a chaplain's "equal opportunity for all men" (1954) to the Allard and Sessions (108th Congress) 2003 American Dream Downpayment Act, which was designed for the Secretary of Housing "to assist low-income families to achieve homeownership".

== See also ==
- 2008–09 Keynesian resurgence
- House price index
- Journal of Behavioral Finance

Awards
Preceded by Alvin E. Roth; Lloyd S. Shapley	Laureate of the Nobel Memorial Prize in Economics; 2013; Served alongside: Eugene F. Fama, Lars Peter Hansen	Succeeded by Jean Tirole
Academic offices
Preceded by Richard Thaler	President of the American Economic Association; 2016– 2017	Succeeded by Alvin E. Roth
