= David Lereah =

American business executive and author

David Lereah is an American business executive and author. Lereah served as the President of Reecon Advisors, Inc., a real estate advisory and information company located in the Washington, D.C., area, from 2008 to 2020. Lereah was previously an Executive Vice President at Move, Inc. and before that, Chief Economist for the National Association of Realtors (NAR). Lereah served as the NAR's spokesman on economic forecasts, interest rates, home sales, mortgage rates, as well as other policy issues and trends affecting the United States real estate industry. Lereah was also the Chief Economist for the Mortgage Bankers Association during the 1990s and has testified before Congress on economic and real estate matters.

On April 30, 2007, the NAR announced that in May Lereah would be leaving his job as chief economist to join Move, Inc. as an Executive Vice President. He was succeeded by Lawrence Yun. Lereah left Move in 2008 to join Reecon Advisors, Inc.

He received his B.A. in Economics & Marketing from American University, Washington, D.C., and his Ph.D. in economics from the University of Virginia. He lives in Port St. Lucie, Florida.

== Publications ==
Lereah's book The Rules for Growing Rich: Making Money in the New Information Economy touting investment in technology company equities was published in June 2000 at the onset of the collapse of the dot-com bubble.

Lereah has also written about real estate investing. His book All Real Estate is Local was published by Doubleday in 2007. His 2005 book Are You Missing the Real Estate Boom?: Why Home Values and Other Real Estate Investments Will Climb Through The End of The Decade—And How to Profit From Them was rereleased in February 2006 as Why the Real Estate Boom Will Not Bust—And How You Can Profit from It.

In 2020, Lereah published The Power of Positive Aging: Successfully Coping with the Inconveniences of Aging.

== Criticisms ==
Lereah has been criticized for encouraging the rise of the United States housing bubble. According to a HousingPanic blog post quoted by the Chicago Tribune, "In October 2005 Lereah was busy calling the bubble believers 'Chicken Littles.' Many of the predictions espoused by the 'Chicken Littles' are fast becoming closer to reality. ... David Lereah has lost credibility because of his irresponsible cheerleading."

Commenting on the phenomenon of shifting NAR accounts of the national housing market, the Motley Fool reported, in June 2006,

"There's nothing funnier or more satisfying … than watching the National Association of Realtors (NAR) change its tune these days. The latest news release from this sunny-Jim industry group finally fesses up to its past fiction, but even when it admits the bubble's going to pop, it can't muster the courage to just come out and say it. … the NAR is full of it and will spin the numbers any way it can to keep up the pleasant fiction that all is well. … [T]he cracks began to show in subsequent remarks from NAR 'Chief Economist' David Lereah. The head outfit that ridiculed the idea of a housing bubble for years is now crying for Ben Bernanke to bring it back. … It should have been completely obvious to anyone with a loan calculator and a glance at wage increases that those months of industry bubble denials were just wishful thinking."

Business Week also captured Lereah's most famous quote:

"The steady improvement in [home] sales will support price appreciation...[despite] all the wild projections by academics, Wall Street analysts, and others in the media." Lereah was Chief Economist at the National Association of Realtors when he said this. The day was Jan 10, 2007, just as housing prices steadily worsened falling even farther than many skeptics had predicted.

== See also ==
- National Association of Realtors
- Real estate trends
- United States housing bubble
