= Cyclically adjusted price-to-earnings ratio =

Stock market valuation measure

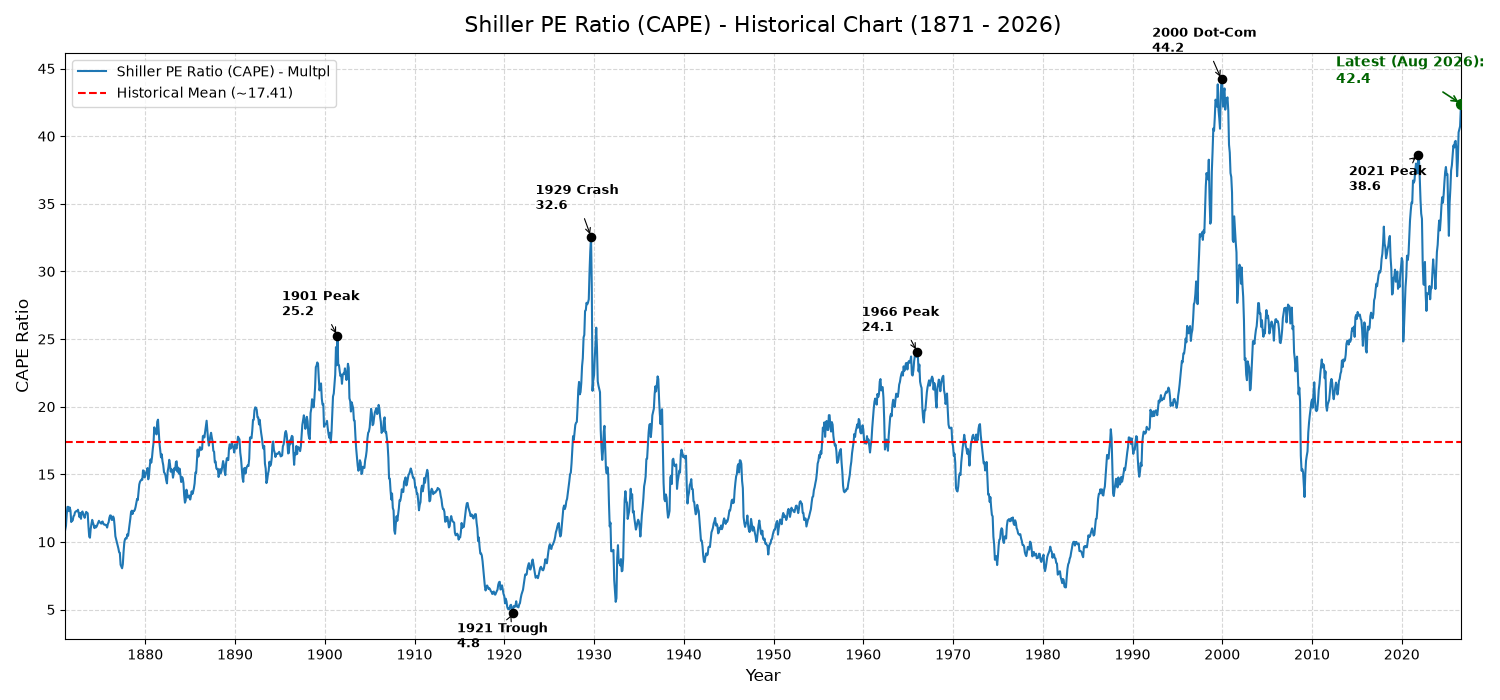
Shiller Index on S&P 500, updated to June 2026

The cyclically adjusted price-to-earnings ratio (CAPE, Shiller P/E, or P/E 10 ratio) is a stock valuation measure usually applied to the US S&P 500 equity market. It is defined as price divided by the average of ten years of earnings (moving average), adjusted for inflation. As such, it is principally used to assess likely future returns from equities over timescales of 10 to 20 years, with higher than average CAPE values implying lower than average long-term annual average returns. The ratio was invented by American economist Robert J. Shiller.

The ratio is used to gauge whether a stock, or group of stocks, is undervalued or overvalued by comparing its current market price to its inflation-adjusted historical earnings record.

It is a variant of the more popular price to earning ratio and is calculated by dividing the current price of a stock by its average inflation-adjusted earnings over the last 10 years.

Using average earnings over the last decade helps to smooth out the impact of business cycles and other events and gives a better picture of a company's sustainable earning power.

It is not intended as an indicator of impending market crashes, although high CAPE values have been associated with such events.

== Background ==
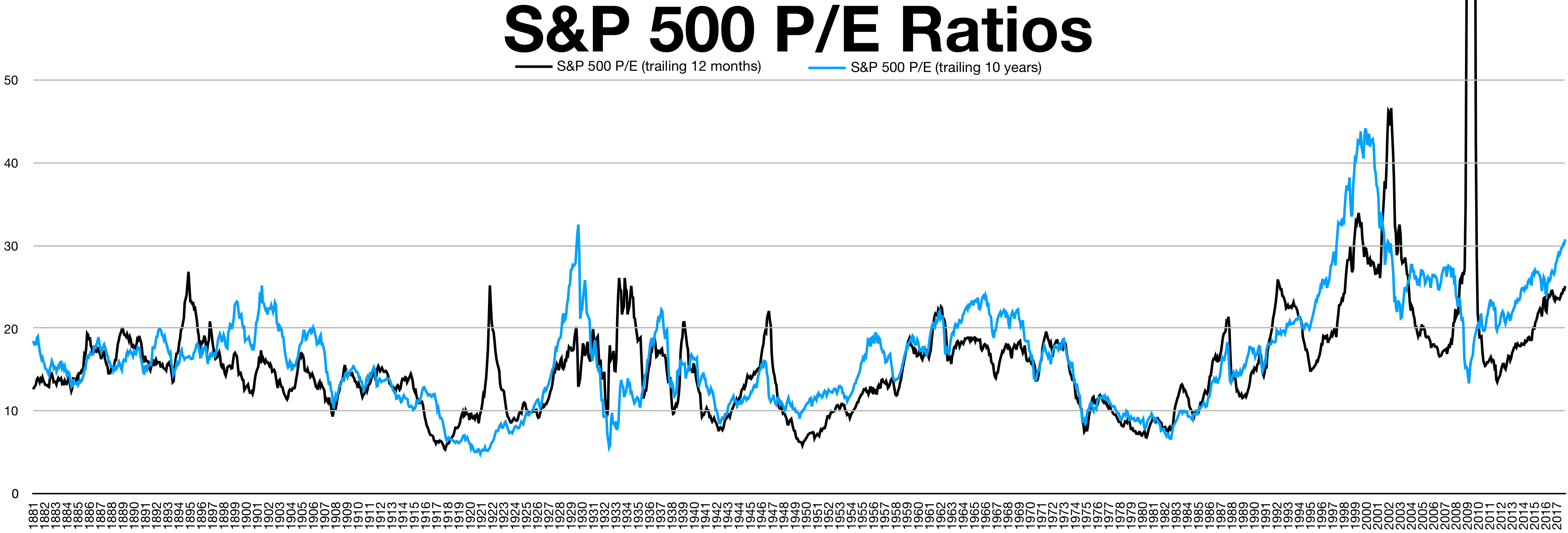
S&P 500 Shiller P/E ratio compared to trailing 12 months P/E ratio

Value investors Benjamin Graham and David Dodd argued for smoothing a firm's earnings over the past five to ten years in their classic text Security Analysis. Graham and Dodd noted one-year earnings were too volatile to offer a good idea of a firm's true earning power.

From the 1940s, Sir John Templeton used a method adapted from Graham and Dodd, and somewhat similar to the later Shiller P/E, but with the Dow Jones Industrial Index. Templeton used this calculation to estimate future stock returns and re-balance client portfolios if needed.

In a 1988 paper economists John Y. Campbell and Robert Shiller concluded that "a long moving average of real earnings helps to forecast future real dividends" which in turn are correlated with returns on stocks. The idea is to take a long-term average of earnings (typically 5 or 10 year) and adjust for inflation to forecast future returns. The long term average smooths out short term volatility of earnings and medium-term business cycles in the general economy and they thought it was a better reflection of a firm's long term earning power.

Shiller later popularized the 10-year version of Graham and Dodd's P/E as a way to value the stock market as measured by the S&P 500. In 2013 Shiller earned a one-third share of the Nobel Memorial Prize in Economic Sciences for his work in the empirical analysis of asset prices.

== Use in forecasting future returns ==
Using market data from both estimated (1881–1956) and actual (1957 onward) earnings reports from the S&P 500 index, Shiller and Campbell found that the lower the CAPE, the higher the investors' likely return from equities over the following 20 years. The average CAPE value for the 20th century was 15.21; this corresponds to an average annual return over the next 20 years of around 6.6 per cent. CAPE values above this level tend to produce corresponding lower returns, and vice versa. In 2014, Shiller expressed concern that the prevailing CAPE of over 25 was "a level that has been surpassed since 1881 in only three previous periods: the years clustered around 1929, 1999 and 2007. Major market drops followed those peaks" (ref 4). A high CAPE ratio has been linked to the phrase "irrational exuberance" and to Shiller's book of the same name. After Fed President Alan Greenspan coined the term in 1996, the CAPE ratio reached an all-time high during the 2000 dot-com bubble. It also reached a historically high level again during the housing bubble up to 2007 before the crash of the great recession.

However, Shiller's views on what CAPE value is a predictor of poor returns have been criticized as overly pessimistic and based on the original definition of CAPE, which fails to take into account changes in accounting standards in the 1990s, which, according to a 2013 paper by professor Jeremy Siegel, produce understated earnings. However, a 2020 article showing S&P returns from 1995 to 2020, and specifically addressing accounting changes, found significant predictive accuracy for the CAPE ratio. In 95% of 10-year periods actual returns were within 2.74% of CAPE projections, and in 67% of 10-year periods market returns were within 1.37% of CAPE predictions.

The CAPE ratio exhibits a significant amount of variation over time, and has been criticized as "not always accurate in signaling market tops or bottoms", though the CAPE ratio was never intended to predict crashes or low-points. One proposed reason for this significant time variation is that CAPE does not take into account prevailing risk-free rates of return. Thus, a common debate is whether the inverse CAPE ratio should be further divided by the yield on 10 year Treasuries, a common measure of risk-minimised return.

Another criticism of the CAPE ratio is that it—like many other financial metrics—rely on backward-looking data. Some financial analysts believe forward-looking metrics, such as forward P/E, are more helpful in determining whether the stock market is over- or under-valued. However, these data are based on an aggregate collection of analyst estimates which can change quickly, or in some cases, are not regularly updated.

As of 2024, some researchers have sought an improvement to CAPE which reflect changes in dividend payout ratios, which measure the percentage of earnings companies pay to shareholders via dividends or devote to other uses. The fraction of earnings not paid out in dividends is either reinvested in the business, or is used for stock buybacks. Reinvesting earnings in the business is done in the expectation of growing future earnings, and it is argued this projected earnings growth should ideally be accounted for when smoothing earnings over the previous ten years for the purpose of predicting long-term future earnings. This modified measure has been referred to as P-CAPE, or “payout and cyclically-adjusted earnings.”

== CAPE for other equity markets ==
Originally derived for the US equity market, the CAPE has since been calculated for 15 other markets. Research by Norbert Keimling has demonstrated that the same relation between CAPE and future equity returns exists in every equity market so far examined. Research by others has also found CAPE ratios are reliable in estimating market returns over five to ten year periods in many international stock markets.

It also suggests that comparison of CAPE values can assist in identifying the best markets for future equity returns beyond the US market.

== See also ==
- Price–earnings ratio
