= Fedspeak =

Intentionally obfuscating remarks by U.S. federal reserve to prevent market shocks

In monetary policy of the United States, the term Fedspeak (also known as Greenspeak) is what Alan Blinder called "a turgid dialect of English" used by Federal Reserve Board chairs in making wordy, vague, and ambiguous statements. The strategy, which was used most prominently by Alan Greenspan, was used to prevent financial markets from overreacting to the chairman's remarks. The coinage is an intentional parallel to Newspeak.

Fedspeak when used by Alan Greenspan is often called Greenspeak. An alternative definition of Greenspeak is "the coded and careful language employed by U.S. Federal Reserve Board Chairman Alan Greenspan."

Edwin le Heron and Emmanuel Carre state that "Nowadays, 'Fedspeak' (Bernanke, 2004) means clear and extensive communication of the Fed's action." Chairman Ben Bernanke and Chairwoman Yellen have effected a major change in Fed communication policy departing from the obfuscation that characterized the previous three decades. In 2014 a new detailed level of Fed communication was dubbed Fedspeak 3.0. In 2018, Chairman Jerome Powell would begin press conferences with a summary statement in plain English, in contrast to his predecessors who would read lengthy prepared statements loaded with monetary policy jargon.

In 2021, Powell used a recursive syntax in saying that "you can think of this meeting that we had as the 'talking about talking about' meeting." He added, "I now suggest that we retire that term."

== Origin ==
The notion of fed speak originated from the fact that financial markets placed a heavy value on the statements made by Federal Reserve governors, which could in turn lead to a self-fulfilling prophecy. To prevent this, the governors developed a language, termed Fedspeak, in which ambiguous and cautious statements were made to purposefully obscure and detract meaning from the statement.

Though previous "Fed" chairmen Arthur Burns and Paul Volcker were known for blowing smoke, both literally and figuratively, when appearing before Congress, Alan Greenspan is credited with making Fedspeak a "high-art". It is unclear whether the term Fedspeak was used widely prior to Greenspan, but with historical hindsight the modern term could be used to describe Burns's and Volcker's method.

== Usage by Alan Greenspan ==
He used to take pride in the resulting obfuscation—even characterizing his own way of communicating as 'mumbling with great incoherence'. In a famous incident, he once told a US senator who claimed to have understood what the famously obscurantist chairman had just said, "in that case, I must have misspoken".
— How do central banks talk?

Although it was originally believed by some that Alan Greenspan, who is generally credited for popularizing Fedspeak, may have used such language unintentionally, he revealed in his 2007 book The Age of Turbulence, that the method of avoiding the issues directly when a clear message was not desired was indeed intentional. Greenspan states that the confusion, which often resulted in conflicting interpretations, was used to prevent unintended jolts to the markets as confusing statements were typically ignored.

He noted that he came upon the dialect while at the Fed: "What I've learned at the Federal Reserve is a new language which is called 'Fed-speak'. You soon learn to mumble with great incoherence."

In an interview with 60 Minutes's Lesley Stahl on September 16, 2007, Stahl stated how "In public, Greenspan was inscrutable whenever congress asked about interest rates. He resorted to an indecipherable delphic dialect known as fedspeak" to which Greenspan responded that "I would engage in some form of syntax destruction which sounded as though I were answering the question, but in fact, had not." When Stahl noted that Greenspan's responses were "impenetrably profound" and that this resulted in "two newspapers getting opposing headlines coming out of the same hearing", Greenspan responded that "I succeeded".

In an interview with CNBC's Maria Bartiromo on September 17, 2007, when asked to describe Fedspeak, Greenspan described it as:

It's a—a language of purposeful obfuscation to avoid certain questions coming up, which you know you can't answer, and saying—'I will not answer,' or basically, 'no comment,' is, in fact, an answer. So, you end up with when, say, a Congressman asks you a question, and don't wanna say, 'No comment', or 'I won't answer', or something like that. So, I proceed with four or five sentences which get increasingly obscure. The Congressman thinks I answered the question and goes onto the next one.

In an interview with BusinessWeek in August 2012, when asked "about practicing the art of constructive ambiguity", Greenspan replied:

As Fed chairman, every time I expressed a view, I added or subtracted 10 basis points from the credit market. That was not helpful. But I nonetheless had to testify before Congress. On questions that were too market-sensitive to answer, 'no comment' was indeed an answer. And so you construct what we used to call Fed-speak. I would hypothetically think of a little plate in front of my eyes, which was the Washington Post, the following morning's headline, and I would catch myself in the middle of a sentence. Then, instead of just stopping, I would continue on resolving the sentence in some obscure way which made it incomprehensible. But nobody was quite sure I wasn't saying something profound when I wasn't. And that became the so-called Fed-speak which I became an expert on over the years. It's a self-protection mechanism ... when you're in an environment where people are shooting questions at you, and you've got to be very careful about the nuances of what you're going to say and what you don't say.

== Examples of Greenspeak ==
The Fed has a language all its own, and unfortunately, the folks over at Rosetta Stone have yet to create a program to help laypeople understand what the hell the fed is talking about.
— Ron Insana

As of 2011, the Federal Reserve Bank of Dallas website still maintains a "Greenspeak" page with dozens of excerpts from Greenspan's past statements as head of the Federal Reserve Bank. Each quotation has a pointer to its full context in his speech, and is posted without commentary or interpretation.

The members of the Board of Governors and the Reserve Bank presidents foresee an implicit strengthening of activity after the current rebalancing is over, although the central tendency of their individual forecasts for real GDP still shows a substantial slowdown, on balance, for the year as a whole.

— Alan Greenspan, Testimony from the Federal Reserve Board's semiannual monetary policy report to the Congress before the Committee on Banking, Housing, and Urban Affairs, U.S. Senate on February 13, 2001

Risk takers have been encouraged by a perceived increase in economic stability to reach out to more distant time horizons. But long periods of relative stability often engender unrealistic expectations of it[s] permanence and, at times, may lead to financial excess and economic stress.

— Alan Greenspan, testimony on his 35th appearance before the Financial Services Committee of the US House of Representatives on July 20, 2005

Clearly, sustained low inflation implies less uncertainty about the future, and lower risk premiums imply higher prices of stocks and other earning assets. We can see that in the inverse relationship exhibited by price/earnings ratios and the rate of inflation in the past. But how do we know when irrational exuberance has unduly escalated asset values, which then become subject to unexpected and prolonged contractions as they have in Japan over the past decade?

— Alan Greenspan, "The Challenge of Central Banking in a Democratic Society", 1996-12-05

I would generally expect that today in Washington DC the probability of changes in the weather is highly uncertain, but we are monitoring the data in such a way that we will be able to update people on changes that are important.

— Alan Greenspan, Greenspan describing the weather in response to a question by Owen Bennett-Jones on BBC's The Interview (October 2007)

== Other usage ==
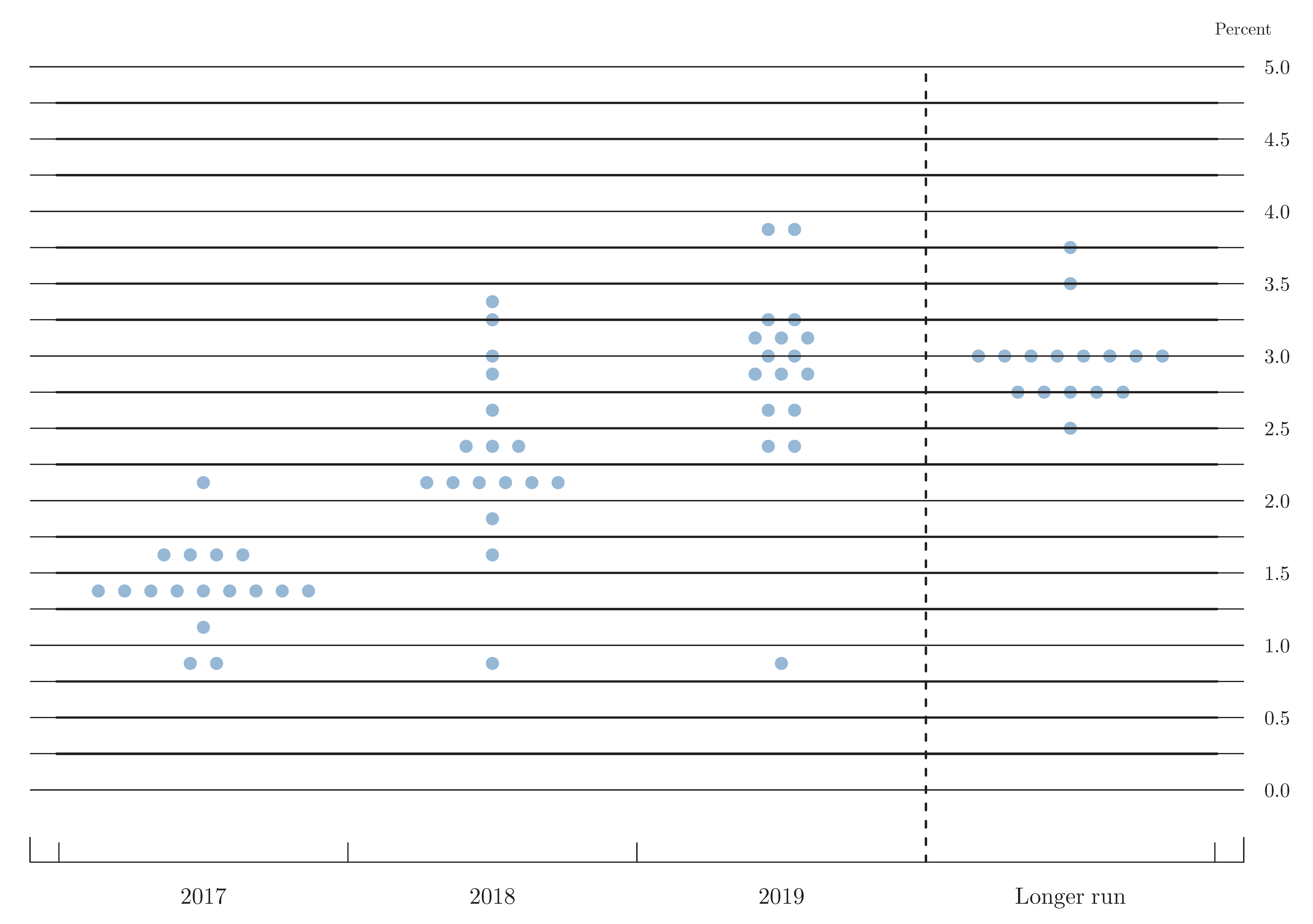
The U.S. Federal Open Market Committee "dot plot" for March, 2017: participants' assessments of appropriate monetary policy: Midpoint of target range or target level for the federal funds rate. The chart resembles a plot of objective economic data, but each dot represents a mere opinion of an individual committee member predicting a hypothetical future. The horizontal axis shows the future time in years, and the vertical axis shows the federal funds rate in percent.

In the 2010s, the Federal Reserve Open Market rate-setting committee (FOMC) began publishing dot plots to tabulate all individual committee member projections of target interest rates in a single graphic. In 2016, the president of the St. Louis Fed James Bullard began a movement away from the dot plot exercise, citing a gap of opinion between market economists and FOMC members. As of 2018, the FOMC has continued to publish dot plots in its economic projections, detailing the variety of opinions of the committee members for the "appropriate target range for the federal funds rate" in future years.

== Commentary ==
The University of Virginia Writing Program Instructor Site offers some selected quotations from Greenspan, with a suggestion that students be given writing exercise assignments of clarifying their expression of ideas.

A public relations firm cites an example of "Greenspeak" as the statement of one of the "master practitioners of creative ambiguity over the years". The brief essay mentions two other master practitioners of obfuscation, Hubert H. Humphrey and Casey Stengel. The overall tone of the essay is one of awed admiration for a sometimes-necessary skill in obscurantism. In closing, the writer notes that, "As professional performers say, to deliberately sing off-key requires a highly skilled singer."

== See also ==
- Index of public relations-related articles
- Security through obscurity
- Technobabble
- Officialese
