= Irrational Exuberance (book) =

2000 book by Robert Shiller

- The third edition
- Author: Robert J. Shiller
- Language: English
- Subject: Stock market
- Genre: Non-fiction
- Publisher: Princeton University Press
- Publication date: March 15, 2000
- Publication place: United States
- Media type: Print, e-book
- Pages: 312 pp. (hardcover)
- ISBN: 978-0691050621
- OCLC: 263711758

Irrational Exuberance is a book by American economist Robert J. Shiller of Yale University, published March 2000. The book examines economic bubbles in the 1990s and early 2000s, and is named after Federal Reserve Chairman Alan Greenspan's famed 1996 comment about "irrational exuberance" warning of such a possible bubble.

== Overview ==
Published at the height of the dot-com boom, the text put forth several arguments demonstrating how the stock markets were overvalued at the time, and likely to offer poor return on investment based on analysis of the cyclically adjusted price-to-earnings ratio which Shiller co-developed in the late 1980s. The dot-com bubble peaked the month of the book's publication as measured by the Nasdaq stock index, before a gradual collapse by over 80% in the next two years.

The second edition of Irrational Exuberance was published in 2005 and was updated to cover the housing bubble. Shiller wrote that the real estate bubble might soon burst, and he supported his claim by showing that median home prices were six to nine times greater than median income in some areas of the country, far above historical long-term averages. He also showed that home prices, when adjusted for inflation, have produced very modest returns of less than 1% per year when measured over long-term periods. Housing prices peaked in 2006 and the housing bubble burst in 2007 and 2008, an event partially responsible for the Worldwide recession of 2008–2009.

The third edition of Irrational Exuberance was published in 2015 and included new material on bonds. Shiller warned of significant downside risk to holding long term bonds. Shiller also warned that global house prices were approaching bubble territory and that US stock prices are high.

== Reactions ==
Finance professor Eugene Fama of The University of Chicago has written that Shiller "has been consistently pessimistic about prices," so given a long enough horizon, Shiller can claim foresight in predicting any crisis. Fama, Shiller and Lars Peter Hansen were co-recipients of the 2013 Nobel Prize in Economics. Shiller and Fama have had a long-running dispute, with Shiller arguing Fama's efficient market hypothesis is seriously flawed.

Nassim Nicholas Taleb, a retired Wall Street options trader, spoke highly of Shiller's book in his own Fooled By Randomness (2001). The pair struck up a friendship, and in revised editions of Randomness Taleb says he urged Shiller to update Irrational Exuberance for what turned out to be the book's second edition.

Kirkus Reviews praised the third edition of the book, saying it was a rarity among economic publications in being loyal to the complexities of the subject while "wholly accessible to general readers."

== Quotations ==
"[t]he stock market has not come down to historical levels: the price-earnings ratio as I define it in this book is still, at this writing [2005], in the mid-20s, far higher than the historical average. ... People still place too much confidence in the markets and have too strong a belief that paying attention to the gyrations in their investments will someday make them rich, and so they do not make conservative preparations for possible bad outcomes."

== Gallery ==
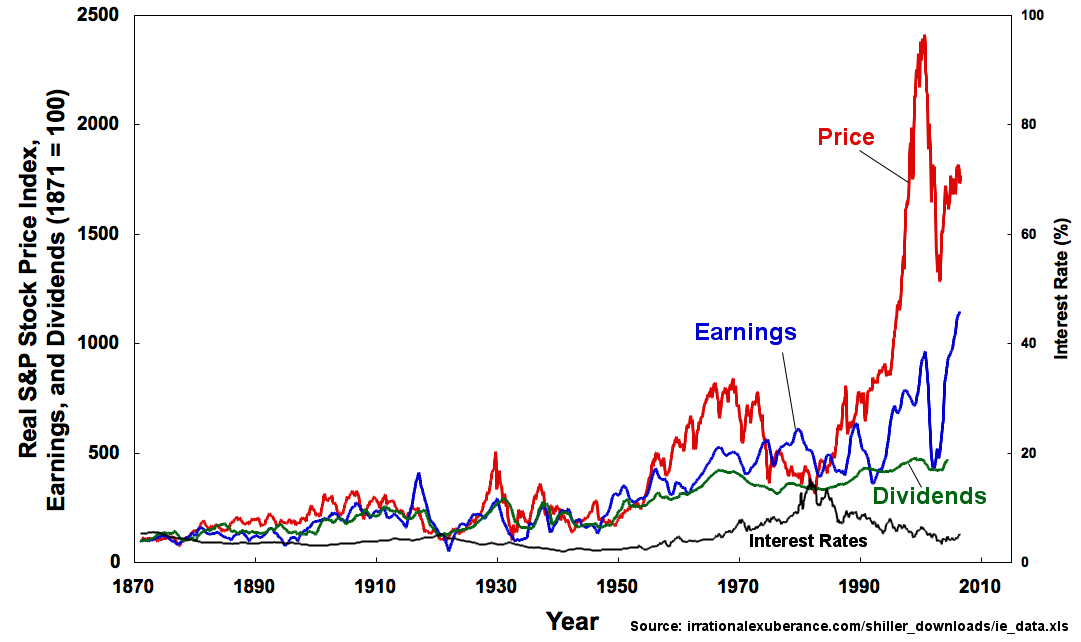
The plot of the S&P Composite Real Price Index, Earnings, Dividends, and Interest Rates. From Irrational Exuberance, 2d ed.

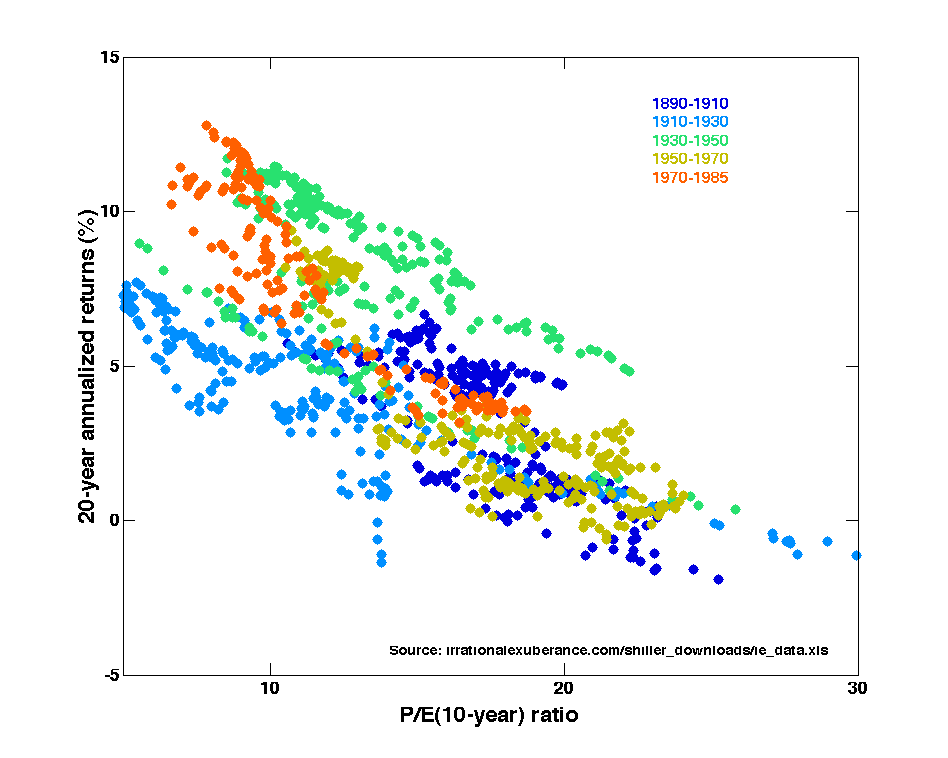
Price-Earnings ratios as a predictor of twenty-year returns. From Irrational Exuberance, 2d ed.

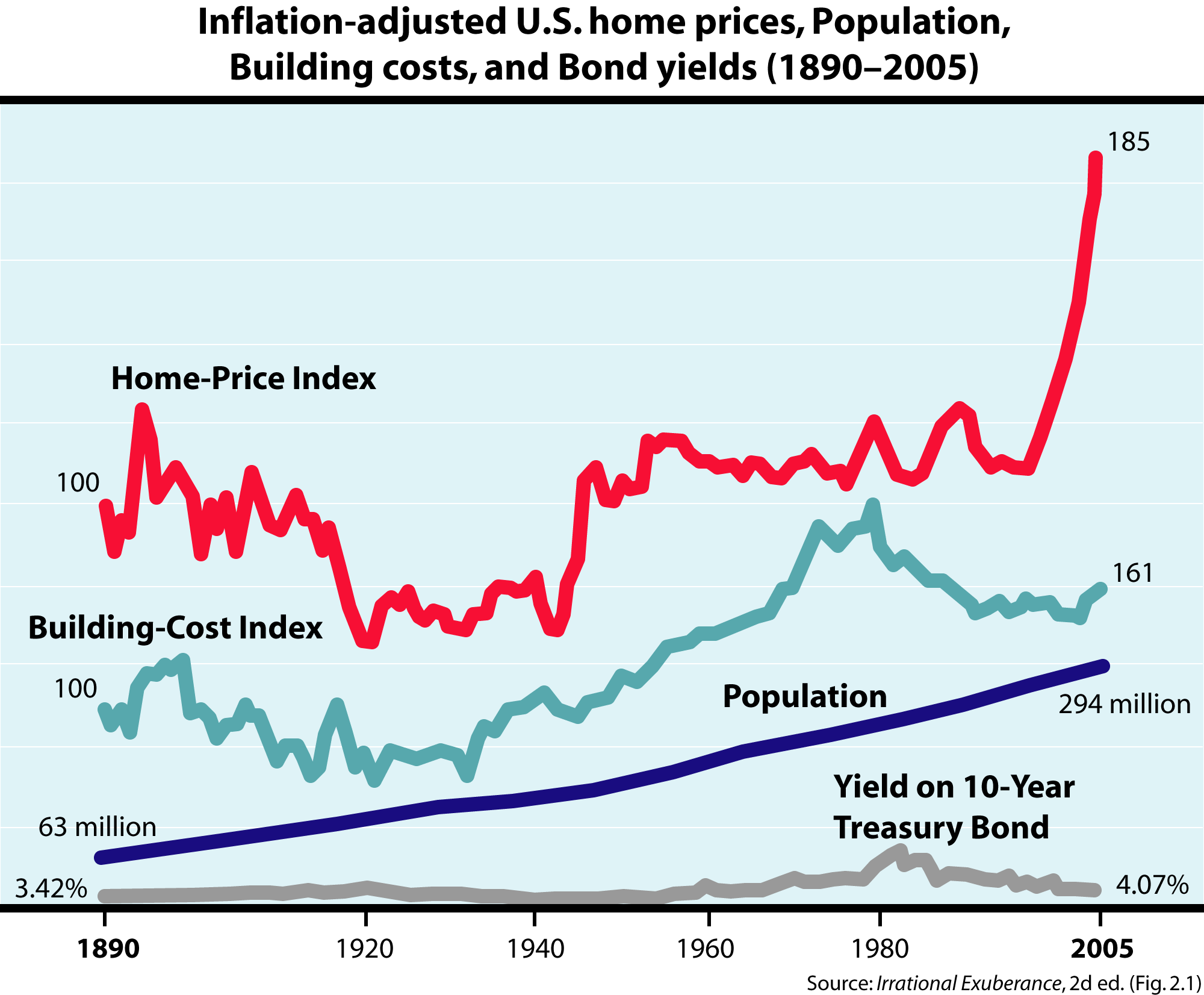
Plot of U.S. home prices, population, building costs, and bond yields. From Irrational Exuberance, 2d ed.
