= Edward Chancellor =

Investment manager and financial historian

- Born: John Edward Horner Chancellor; December 1962 (age 63); Richmond, London, England
- Education: Trinity College, Cambridge; St Antony's College, Oxford
- Occupations: Investment strategist; Financial journalist; Financial historian
- Employers: Lazard Brothers; Grantham, Mayo, van Otterloo
- Known for: Predicting the dot-com bubble, and the credit bubble
- Notable work: Devil Take the Hindmost: A History of Financial Speculation (1999); Crunch-Time for Credit? (2005); The Price of Time: The Real Story of Interest (2022)
- Spouse: Antonia Phillips
- Relatives: Anna Chancellor (sister); Cecilia Chancellor (cousin)
- Awards: George Polk Award in 2007
- Website: www.edwardchancellor.com

John "Edward" Horner Chancellor (born December 1962), is an English financial historian, finance journalist, and former hedge fund investment strategist and former investment banker. In 2016, the Financial Analysts Journal called him "one of the great financial writers of our era", and in 2022, Fortune called him "one of the greatest financial historians alive".

Chancellor is noted for what were retrospectively recognized as prescient warnings of the three major economic bubbles since 2000: Devil Take the Hindmost: A History of Financial Speculation (1999, anticipating the dot-com bubble), Crunch-Time for Credit? (2005, anticipating the credit bubble), and The Price of Time: The Real Story of Interest (2022, anticipating the everything bubble).

== Early life and education ==
Chancellor was born in Richmond, England, to publisher John Paget Chancellor (the editor of Knowledge), the eldest son of Sir Christopher Chancellor and Mary Jolliffe, who was the daughter of Lord Hylton. The Chancellor family were Scottish gentry who owned land at Quothquan since 1432. His sister is the actress Anna Chancellor.

He graduated from Trinity College, Cambridge, with first class honours in Modern History, and later from St Antony's College, Oxford, with a Master of Philosophy in Modern History.

== Investment career ==
After graduation, Chancellor worked for the investment bank Lazard Brothers in mergers & acquisitions from the early 1990s, and from 2008 to 2014, he was a senior member of the asset allocation team, and of the capital markets research team, at the Boston investment firm Grantham, Mayo, van Otterloo & Co. (GMO).

Chancellor has worked for Marathon Asset Management in London. Since 2024 he has hosted their podcast, The Capital Cycle.

== Writing career ==
=== Author ===
In 1999, Chancellor published Devil Take the Hindmost: A History of Financial Speculation, which made the long-list of the New York Times Notable Books of the Year. Martin Vander Weyer in the Spectator called the book a much more entertaining version of Charles P. Kindleberger's 1978 work Manias, Panics and Crashes.

In 2022, William J. Bernstein said of the book, "More than 20 years ago, Edward Chancellor's Devil Take the Hindmost supplied readers with one of the most engaging and incisive descriptions of financial manias ever written". Bernstein added, "Besides being a first-rate economic historian, Chancellor is also a master wordsmith; almost unique among serious finance books".

In 2005, he published Crunch Time for Credit?, an analysis of the credit boom in the United States and the United Kingdom. The book came from a 2005 report Chancellor wrote for British hedge fund manager Crispin Odey on the growing housing and credit bubble. In 2009, Charles Moore wrote of the book, "Chancellor foresaw almost everything. His report listed the common features of the US and British credit booms, including 'a shared belief in the new paradigm and the ability of central bankers to save the day', 'low-income growth yet also strong growth in consumer spending, largely fuelled by home equity withdrawal' and 'rising government deficits.'"

In 2022, he published The Price of Time: The Real Story of Interest, which criticized the orthodox central banking policy of continually lowering interest rates, and using perpetual quantitative easing, to generate economic growth via asset price inflation. A policy that Chancellor predicted had resulted in an everything bubble in asset prices, extreme wealth inequality (particularly between the generations), and that would end in very high levels of price inflation.

Martin Wolf in the Financial Times described the book as "a polemic against everything [Ben] Bernanke stands for" when reviewing it alongside former Fed chair Ben Bernanke's own 2022 book, 21st Century Monetary Policy. Martin Vander Weyer praised the book describing it as a more engaging read on the subject area than Thomas Piketty's Capital in the Twenty-First Century. Emma Duncan in the Sunday Times praised the book and said Chancellor had a "gift for timing", as his two earlier books had forewarned of bubbles in speculation – the dot-com bubble, and the credit bubble – that eventually burst. Finance author Felix Martin called the book a "timely warning" of central bank folly, and given the prescient nature of Chancellor's previous two books, said that as well as buying the book, investors should "sell all your stocks". In August 2022, the book was added to the list for the Financial Times Business Book of the Year Award for 2022.

The journalist John Tierney, in his comments introducing Chancellor at the 2023 Hayek Lecture, said the author possessed "an extremely rare gift" in the timing of his writings. Regarding The Price of Time, for which Chancellor received the Hayek Award, Tierney added, "His book is remarkable not only for its prescience, but also for its erudition and its flair".

=== Journalist ===
During and after his period as a full-time investment manager, Chancellor has also provided opinion pieces and articles for the Reuters financial commentary website Breakingviews, and the Institutional Investor. He has also contributed opinion pieces to other financial publications, including the Wall Street Journal, MoneyWeek, the New York Review of Books, and the Financial Times.

In 2008, Chancellor was announced as the winner of the 2007 George Polk Award in Financial Reporting for his 2007 article Ponzi Nation that he wrote for Institutional Investor. His citation noted that Chancellor had "warned months before the market decline that excessive risk-taking and interconnected investments – fueled by subprime mortgages and the activities of lightly regulated hedge funds – could cause calamity for world economies". He was the first-ever writer for Institutional Investor to win a George Polk Award.

During the run-up to the 2016 Brexit referendum, Chancellor wrote in his columns about why he had decided to vote to leave saying that the "European project has morphed from Kant's ideal of an international federation into something akin to the late Habsburg Empire".

== Awards ==
- 2007 George Polk Award – Financial Reporting, for his Ponzi Nation article in Institutional Investor.
- 2023 Hayek Book Prize, conferred by the Manhattan Institute, for The Price of Time: The Real Story of Interest

== Notable works ==
=== As author ===
- Devil Take the Hindmost: A History of Financial Speculation (1st ed.). Farrar, Straus and Giroux. June 1999. ISBN 978-0374138585.
- Crunch Time for Credit?. Harriman House. February 2005. ISBN 978-1-89759-753-8.
- The Price of Time: The Real Story of Interest. Allen Lane. July 2022. ISBN 978-0241569160.

=== As co-author ===
- The Making of a Permabear. With Jeremy Grantham. Atlantic Monthly Press, 13 January 2026. ISBN 978-0-8021-6707-1

=== As editor ===
Chancellor edited two anthologies of investment reports from Marathon Asset Management (London):

- Capital Account: A Money Manager's Reports from a Turbulent Decade (1993–2002). Thomson/Texere. April 2004. ISBN 978-1-58799-180-6.
- Capital Returns: Investing Through the Capital Cycle: A Money Manager's Reports 2002–15. Palgrave Macmillan. November 2015. ISBN 978-1137571649.

=== As journalist ===
- "Ponzi Nation". Institutional Investor. February 2007., for which Chancellor won the 2007 George Polk Award in Financial Reporting.
- "Wall Street is firmly in Wonderland". Reuters. 9 July 2020.

== See also ==
- Asquith family - Chancellor is descended from Prime Minister H. H. Asquith through his maternal grandmother
- Everything bubble
- Greenspan put
