= Foroohar =

Foroohar may refer to:

- Rana Foroohar (born 1970), American journalist
- Faravahar, symbol of Iran and Zoroastrianism
