= Alan Greenspan =

American economist (1926–2026)

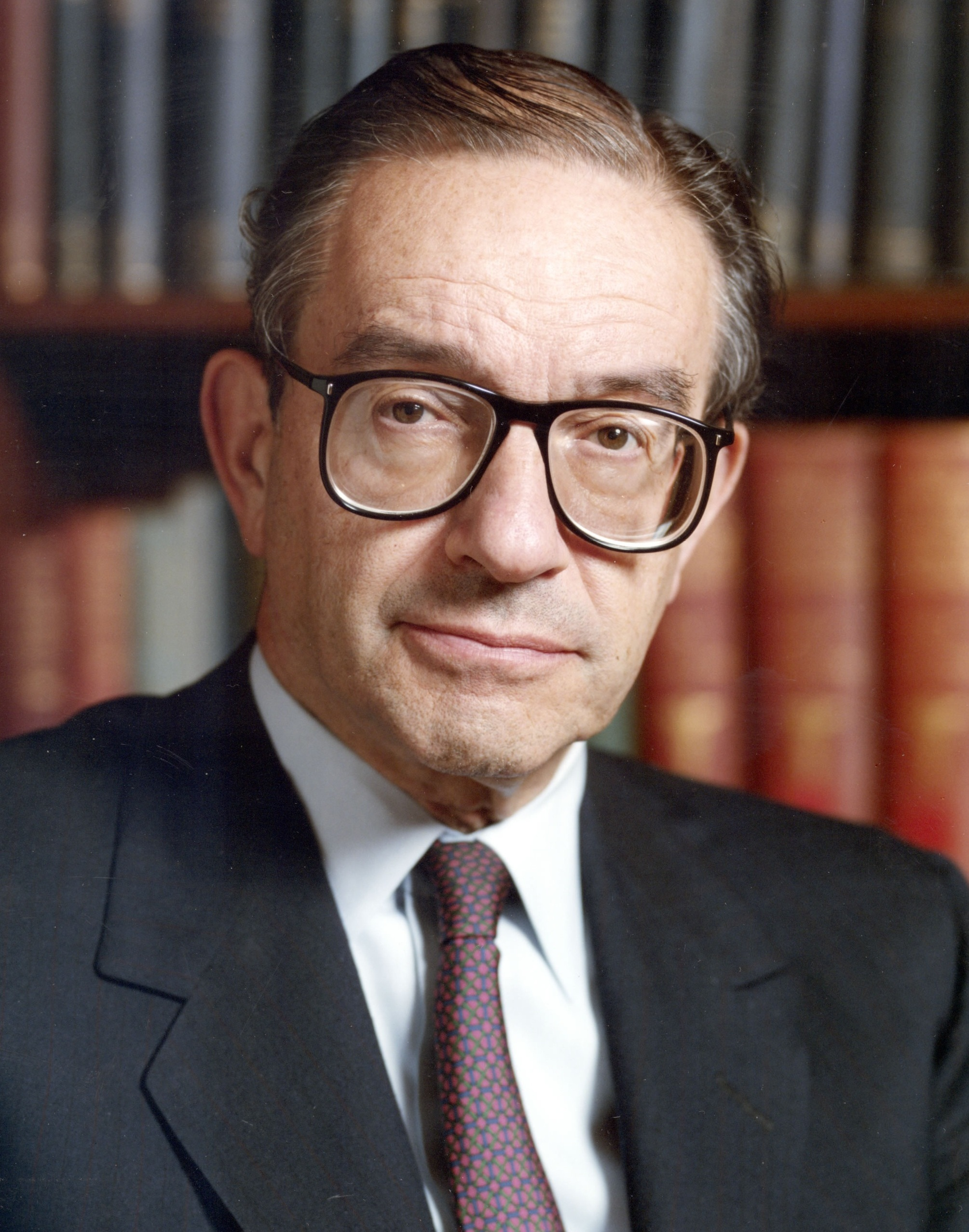
- Official portrait

13th Chair of the Federal Reserve
- In office August 11, 1987 – January 31, 2006
- President: Ronald Reagan; George H. W. Bush; Bill Clinton; George W. Bush
- Deputy: Manley Johnson; David Mullins; Alan Blinder; Alice Rivlin; Roger Ferguson
- Preceded by: Paul Volcker
- Succeeded by: Ben Bernanke

Member of the Federal Reserve Board of Governors
- In office August 11, 1987 – January 31, 2006
- President: Ronald Reagan; George H. W. Bush; Bill Clinton; George W. Bush
- Preceded by: Paul Volcker
- Succeeded by: Ben Bernanke

10th Chair of the Council of Economic Advisers
- In office September 4, 1974 – January 20, 1977
- President: Gerald Ford
- Preceded by: Herbert Stein
- Succeeded by: Charles Schultze

Personal details
- Born: March 6, 1926 New York City, U.S.
- Died: June 22, 2026 (aged 100) Washington, D.C., U.S.
- Party: Republican
- Spouses: Joan Mitchell (m. 1952; ann. 1953) Andrea Mitchell (m. 1997)
- Education: New York University (BA, MA, PhD)
- Scientific career
- Fields: Economics
- Thesis: Papers on Economic Theory and Policy (1977)

Alan Greenspan (March 6, 1926 – June 22, 2026) was an American economist who served as the 13th chair of the Federal Reserve from 1987 to 2006. He worked as a private adviser and provided consulting for firms through his company, Greenspan Associates LLC.

First nominated to the Federal Reserve by President Ronald Reagan in August 1987, Greenspan was reappointed at successive four-year intervals until retiring in January 2006, after the second-longest tenure in the position, behind only William McChesney Martin. President George W. Bush appointed Ben Bernanke as his successor. Greenspan came to the Federal Reserve Board from a consulting career. Although he was subdued in his public appearances, favorable media coverage raised his profile to a point that several observers likened him to a "rock star". Democratic leaders of Congress criticized him for politicizing his office because of his support for social security privatization and tax cuts.

Many have argued that the "easy-money" policies of the Fed during Greenspan's tenure, including the practice known as the "Greenspan put", were a leading cause of the dot-com bubble and subprime mortgage crisis (the latter occurring within a year of his leaving the Fed), which, said The Wall Street Journal, "tarnished his reputation". Yale economist Robert Shiller argues that "once stocks fell, real estate became the primary outlet for the speculative frenzy that the stock market had unleashed". Greenspan argued that the housing bubble was not a result of low-interest short-term rates but rather a worldwide phenomenon caused by the progressive decline in long-term interest rates – a direct consequence of the relationship between high savings rates in the developing world and its inverse in the developed world.

== Early life and education ==
Alan Greenspan was born on March 6, 1926, in the Washington Heights neighborhood of New York City. His father, Herbert Greenspan, was of Romanian Jewish descent, and his mother, Rose Goldsmith, was of Hungarian Jewish descent. After his parents divorced, Greenspan grew up with his mother in the household of his maternal grandparents who were born in Russia. His father worked as a stockbroker and consultant in New York City.

Greenspan attended George Washington High School from 1940 until he graduated in June 1943; one of his classmates was John Kemeny. He played clarinet and saxophone along with Stan Getz. He further studied clarinet at the Juilliard School from 1943 to 1944. Among his bandmates in the Woody Herman band was Leonard Garment, Richard Nixon's special counsel. He reported to a draft board for potential military service in World War II and was rejected as medically unfit in 1944 due to a spot on his lung.

In 1945, Greenspan attended New York University's School of Commerce, Accounts and Finance (since renamed to the Stern School of Business), where he earned a B.A. degree in economics summa cum laude in 1948 and an M.A. degree in economics in 1950. At Columbia University, he pursued advanced economic studies under Arthur Burns but withdrew because of his increasing work demand at Townsend-Greenspan & Company.

In 1977, Greenspan obtained a Ph.D. in economics from New York University. His dissertation is not available from the university since it was removed at Greenspan's request in 1987, when he became chairman of the Federal Reserve Board. In April 2008, however, Barron's obtained a copy and notes that it includes "a discussion of soaring housing prices and their effect on consumer spending; it even anticipates a bursting housing bubble".

== Career ==
=== Before the Federal Reserve ===
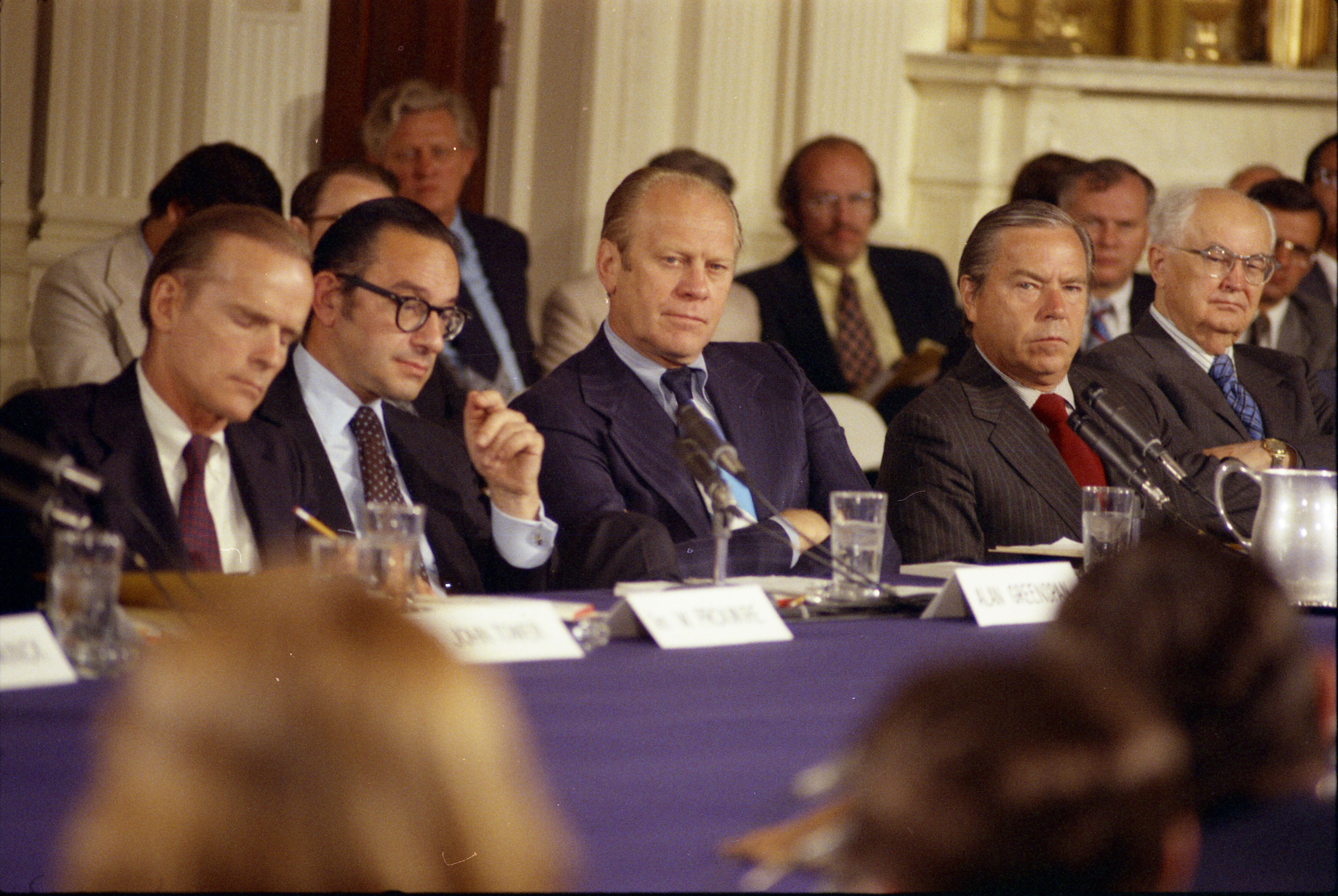
Greenspan seated with William Proxmire, President Gerald Ford, John Rhodes, and Wright Patman at a conference on inflation at the White House in September 1974

During his economics studies at New York University, Greenspan worked under Eugene Banks, a managing director at the Wall Street investment bank Brown Brothers Harriman, in the firm's equity research department. From 1948 to 1953, Greenspan worked as an analyst at the National Industrial Conference Board (currently known as the Conference Board), a business- and industry-oriented think tank in New York City.

From 1955 to 1987, Greenspan was chairman and president of Townsend-Greenspan & Co., Inc., an economics consulting firm in New York City. His 32-year stint there was interrupted only from 1974 to 1977, when he served as chairman of the Council of Economic Advisers, under President Gerald Ford.

In mid-1968, Greenspan agreed to serve as Richard Nixon's coordinator on domestic policy in the latter's campaign for the Republican nomination for President of the United States. Greenspan also served as a corporate director for Aluminum Company of America (Alcoa); Automatic Data Processing; Capital Cities/ABC, Inc.; General Foods; J.P. Morgan & Co.; Morgan Guaranty Trust Company; Mobil Corporation; and the Pittston Company. He was a director of the Council on Foreign Relations foreign policy organization between 1982 and 1988. He also served as a member of the influential Washington-based financial advisory body, the Group of Thirty.

=== Chairman of the Federal Reserve ===
What I've learned at the Federal Reserve is a new language which is called "Fed-speak". You soon learn to mumble with great incoherence.

— Alan Greenspan,

On June 2, 1987, President Ronald Reagan nominated Greenspan as a successor to Paul Volcker, as chairman of the Board of Governors of the Federal Reserve, and the U.S. Senate confirmed him on August 11, 1987. Investor, author, and commentator Jim Rogers has said that Greenspan lobbied to get this chairmanship.

Two months after his confirmation, Greenspan said immediately following the 1987 stock market crash that the Fed "affirmed today its readiness to serve as a source of liquidity to support the economic and financial system". Although the Federal Reserve followed its announcement with monetary policy actions, which became known as the Greenspan put, George H. W. Bush attributed his re-election loss to a sluggish response. Democratic president Bill Clinton reappointed Greenspan and consulted him on economic matters. Greenspan lent support to Clinton's 1993 deficit-reduction program.

Greenspan was fundamentally a monetarist and Austrian economist in orientation on the economy, and his monetary policy decisions largely followed standard Taylor rule prescriptions (see Taylor 1993 and 1999). Greenspan also played a key role in organizing the U.S. bailout of Mexico during the 1994–1995 Mexican peso crisis. In 2000, Greenspan raised interest rates several times and was criticised for this when the stock market then declined. According to Nobel laureate Paul Krugman, however, "he didn't raise interest rates to curb the market's enthusiasm; he didn't even seek to impose margin requirements on stock market investors. Instead, he waited until the bubble burst, as it did in 2000, then tried to clean up the mess afterward". E. Ray Canterbery agreed with Krugman's criticism. In January 2001, Greenspan, in support of President Bush's proposed tax decrease, stated that the federal surplus could accommodate a significant tax cut while paying down the national debt.

In autumn 2001, in a decisive reaction to the September 11 attacks and various corporate scandals which undermined the economy, the Federal Reserve initiated a series of interest cuts to the federal funds rate to 1% in 2004. While presenting the Federal Reserve's Monetary Policy Report in July 2002, he said that "It is not that humans have become any more greedy than in generations past. It is that the avenues to express greed had grown so enormously", and suggested that financial markets need to be more regulated. His critics, led by Steve Forbes, attributed the rapid rise in commodity prices and gold to Greenspan's loose monetary policy, which Forbes believed had caused excessive asset inflation and a weak dollar. By late 2004, the price of gold hit a 16-year high of $440 per ounce.

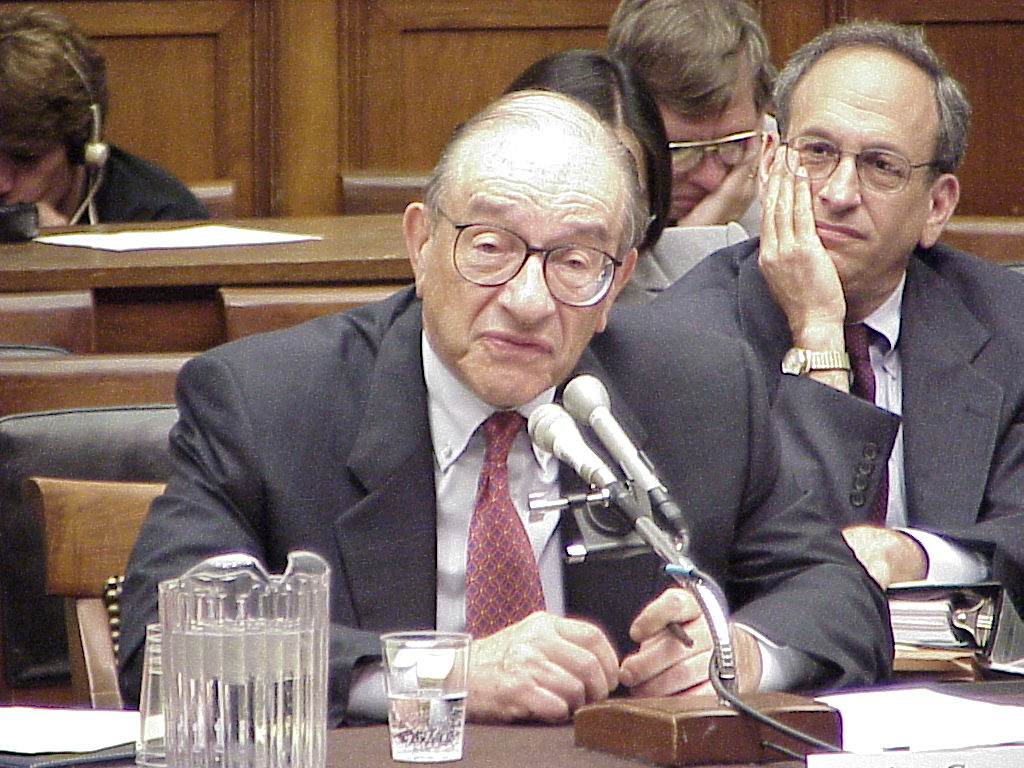
Alan Greenspan in 2005

Greenspan advised senior members of the George W. Bush administration to depose Saddam Hussein for the sake of the oil markets. He believed that even a moderate disruption to the flow of oil could translate into high oil prices, which could lead to "chaos" in the global economy and bring the industrial world "to its knees". He feared that Saddam could seize control of the Strait of Hormuz and restrict the transport of oil through it. In a 2007 interview, he said, "people do not realize in this country, for example, how tenuous our ties to international energy are. That is, we on a daily basis require continuous flow. If that flow is shut off, it causes catastrophic effects in the industrial world. And it's that which made him [Saddam] far more important to get out than Bin Laden."

On May 18, 2004, Greenspan was nominated by President George W. Bush to serve for an unprecedented fifth term as chairman of the Federal Reserve. In a May 2005 speech, Greenspan stated: "Two years ago at this conference I argued that the growing array of derivatives and the related application of more-sophisticated methods for measuring and managing risks had been key factors underlying the remarkable resilience of the banking system, which had recently shrugged off severe shocks to the economy and the financial system. At the same time, I indicated some concerns about the risks associated with derivatives, including the risks posed by concentration in certain derivatives markets, notably the over-the-counter (OTC) markets for U.S. dollar interest rate options." Greenspan opposed tariffs against the People's Republic of China for its refusal to let the yuan rise, suggesting instead that any American workers displaced by trade with China could be compensated through unemployment insurance and retraining programs.

In September 2005, Greenspan indicated he planned to retire on schedule on January 31, 2006, when his fifth term as chairman was set to expire. A month later, Bush nominated Ben Bernanke to succeed Greenspan as chairman. As the chairman of the board, Greenspan did not give any broadcast interviews from 1987 through 2005.

=== After the Federal Reserve ===
Immediately after leaving the Fed, Greenspan formed an economic consulting firm, Greenspan Associates LLC. On February 26, 2007, Greenspan forecast a possible recession in the United States before or in early 2008. Stabilizing corporate profits are said to have influenced his comments. The following day, the Dow Jones Industrial Average decreased by 416 points, losing 3.3% of its value. In May 2007, Greenspan was hired as a special consultant by Pacific Investment Management Company (PIMCO) to participate in their quarterly economic forums and speak privately with the bond managers about Fed interest rate policy. In August 2007, Deutsche Bank announced that it would be retaining Greenspan as a senior advisor to its investment banking team and clients.

In mid-January 2008, hedge fund Paulson & Co. hired Greenspan as an adviser. In 2007, Paulson had foreseen the collapse of the sub-prime housing market and hired Goldman Sachs to package their sub-prime holdings into derivatives and sell them. Some economic commentators blamed this collapse on Greenspan's policies while at the Fed. On April 30, 2009, Greenspan offered a defense of the H-1B visa program, telling a U.S. Senate subcommittee that the visa quota is "far too small to meet the need" and saying that it protects U.S. workers from global competition, creating a "privileged elite". Testifying on immigration reform before the Subcommittee on Immigration, Border Security and Citizenship, he said more skilled immigration was needed "as the economy copes with the forthcoming retirement wave of skilled baby boomers".

=== Memoir ===
Greenspan wrote a memoir titled The Age of Turbulence, published in September 2007. Greenspan said that he wrote the book in longhand mostly while soaking in the bathtub, a habit he regularly employed following injuring his back in 1971. Greenspan discussed in his book, among other things, his history in government and economics, capitalism and other economic systems, current issues in the global economy, and future issues that face the global economy.

In the book, Greenspan criticizes President George W. Bush, Vice President Dick Cheney, and the Republican-controlled Congress for abandoning the Republican Party's principles on spending and deficits. Greenspan's criticisms of President Bush include his refusal to veto spending bills, sending the country into increasingly deep deficits, and for "putting political imperatives ahead of sound economic policies". Greenspan wrote, "They swapped principle for power. They ended up with neither. They deserved to lose [the 2006 election]".

Greenspan praised Bill Clinton above all the other presidents for whom he'd worked for his "consistent, disciplined focus on long-term economic growth". Although he respected what he saw as Richard Nixon's immense intelligence, Greenspan found him to be "sadly paranoid, misanthropic and cynical". He said of Gerald Ford that he "was as close to normal as you get in a president, but he was never elected". Regarding future U.S. economic policy, Greenspan recommended improving the U.S. primary and secondary education systems. He asserted that this would narrow the inequality between the minority of high-income earners and most workers whose wages have not grown in proportion with globalization and the nation's GDP growth.

== Objectivism ==
In the early 1950s, Greenspan began an association with novelist and Objectivist philosopher Ayn Rand. Greenspan was introduced to Rand by his first wife, the painter Joan Mitchell. Rand nicknamed Greenspan "the undertaker" because of his penchant for dark clothing and reserved demeanor. Although Greenspan was initially a logical positivist, he was converted to Rand's philosophy of Objectivism by her associate Nathaniel Branden. He became one of the members of Rand's inner circle, the Ayn Rand Collective, who read Atlas Shrugged while it was being written. During the 1950s and 1960s, Greenspan was a proponent of Objectivism, writing articles for Objectivist newsletters and contributing several essays to Rand's 1966 book Capitalism: The Unknown Ideal, including one supporting the gold standard.

During the 1960s, Greenspan offered a ten-lecture course, "The Economics of a Free Society", under the auspices of the Nathaniel Branden Institute. The course highlighted the causes of prosperity and depression, the consequences of government intervention, and the fallacies of collectivist economics. Rand stood beside him at his 1974 swearing-in as chairman of the Council of Economic Advisers. Greenspan and Rand remained friends until her death in 1982.

Greenspan came under criticism from Harry Binswanger, who believes his actions while at work for the Federal Reserve and his publicly expressed opinions on other issues show abandonment of Objectivist and free market principles. When questioned about this, however, he said that in a democratic society, individuals have to make compromises with one another over conflicting ideas about how money should be handled. He said he himself had to make such compromises, because he believed that "we did extremely well" without a central bank and with a gold standard.

In a congressional hearing on October 23, 2008, Greenspan admitted that his free-market ideology, shunning certain regulations, was flawed. When asked about free markets and Rand's ideas, however, Greenspan clarified his stance on laissez faire capitalism and asserted that in a democratic society there could be no better alternative. He stated that the errors that were made stemmed not from the principle, but from the application of competitive markets in "assuming what the nature of risks would be".

Economist E. Ray Canterbery, a writer associated with post-Keynesian/Keynesian economics, argued that Greenspan's association with Rand negatively influenced his policy.

== Reception ==
=== Housing bubble ===
In the wake of the subprime mortgage and credit crisis in 2007, Greenspan stated that there was a bubble in the U.S. housing market, warning in 2007 of "large double-digit declines" in home values "larger than most people expect". Greenspan also noted, however, "I really didn't get it until very late in 2005 and 2006."

Greenspan stated that the housing bubble was "fundamentally engendered by the decline in real long-term interest rates", though he also claimed that long-term interest rates are beyond the control of central banks because "the market value of global long-term securities is approaching $100 trillion" and thus these and other asset markets are large enough that they "now swamp the resources of central banks".

After the September 11, 2001 attacks, the Federal Open Market Committee voted to reduce the federal funds rate from 3.5% to 3.0%. Then, after the accounting scandals of 2002, the Fed dropped the federal funds rate from then current 1.25% to 1.00%. Greenspan stated that this drop in rates would have the effect of leading to a surge in home sales and refinancing, adding that "Besides sustaining the demand for new construction, mortgage markets have also been a powerful stabilizing force over the past two years of economic distress by facilitating the extraction of some of the equity that homeowners have built up over the years".

Barry Ritholtz wrote that Greenspan's policies of adjusting interest rates to historic lows contributed to a housing bubble in the United States. The Federal Reserve acknowledged the connection between lower interest rates, higher home values, and the increased liquidity the higher home values bring to the overall economy: "Like other asset prices, house prices are influenced by interest rates, and in some countries, the housing market is a key channel of monetary policy transmission."

In a February 23, 2004, speech, Greenspan suggested that more homeowners should consider taking out adjustable-rate mortgages (ARMs) where the interest rate adjusts itself to the current interest in the market. The Fed's own funds rate was at a then-all-time low of 1%. A few months after his recommendation, Greenspan began raising interest rates, in a series of rate hikes that would bring the funds rate to 5.25% about two years later. A triggering factor in the subprime mortgage crisis is believed to be the many subprime ARMs that reset at much higher interest rates than what the borrower paid during the first few years of the mortgage.

In 2008, Greenspan expressed great frustration that the February 23 speech was used to criticize him on ARMs and the subprime mortgage crisis, and stated that he had made countervailing comments eight days after it that praised traditional fixed-rate mortgages. In that speech, Greenspan had suggested that lenders should offer to home purchasers a greater variety of "mortgage product alternatives" other than traditional fixed-rate mortgages. Greenspan also praised the rise of the subprime mortgage industry and its tools for assessing credit-worthiness:

Innovation has brought about a multitude of new products, such as subprime loans and niche credit programs for immigrants. Such developments are representative of the market responses that have driven the financial services industry throughout the history of our country ... With these advances in technology, lenders have taken advantage of credit-scoring models and other techniques for efficiently extending credit to a broader spectrum of consumers. ... Where once more-marginal applicants would simply have been denied credit, lenders are now able to quite efficiently judge the risk posed by individual applicants and to price that risk appropriately. These improvements have led to rapid growth in subprime mortgage lending; indeed, today subprime mortgages account for roughly 10 percent of the number of all mortgages outstanding, up from just 1 or 2 percent in the early 1990s.

The subprime mortgage industry collapsed in March 2007, with many of the largest lenders filing for bankruptcy protection in the face of spiraling foreclosure rates. For these reasons, Greenspan has been historically criticized for his role in the rise of the housing bubble and the subsequent problems in the mortgage industry, as well as "engineering" the housing bubble itself.

In 2004, Businessweek magazine analysts argued: "It was the Federal Reserve-engineered decline in rates that inflated the housing bubble ... the most troublesome aspect of the price runup is that many recent buyers are squeezing into houses that they can barely afford by taking advantage of the lower rates available from adjustable-rate mortgages. That leaves them fully exposed to rising rates."

In September 2008, Joseph Stiglitz stated that Greenspan "didn't really believe in regulation; when the excesses of the financial system were noted, (he and others) called for self-regulation—an oxymoron". Greenspan, according to The New York Times, said he himself was blameless. On April 6, 2005, Greenspan called for a substantial increase in the regulation of Fannie Mae and Freddie Mac: "Appearing before the Senate Banking Committee, the Fed chairman, Alan Greenspan, said the enormous portfolios of the companies—nearly a quarter of the home-mortgage market—posed significant risks to the nation's financial system should either company face significant problems." Despite this, Greenspan still claimed to be a firm believer in free markets, although in his 2007 biography he wrote, "History has not dealt kindly with the aftermath of protracted periods of low risk premiums" as seen before the credit crisis of 2008.

In 2009, Robert Reich wrote that "Greenspan's worst move was to contribute to the giant housing bubble and the worst worldwide crash since the Great Depression. In 2004, he lowered interest rates to 1%, enabling banks to borrow money for free, adjusted for inflation. Naturally, the banks wanted to borrow as much as they possibly could, then lend it out, earning nice profits. The situation screamed for government oversight of lending institutions, lest the banks lend to unfit borrowers. He refused, trusting the market to weed out bad credit risks. It did not."

In congressional testimony on October 23, 2008, Greenspan finally conceded error on regulation. The New York Times wrote, "a humbled Mr. Greenspan admitted that he had put too much faith in the self-correcting power of free markets and had failed to anticipate the self-destructive power of wanton mortgage lending ... Mr. Greenspan refused to accept blame for the crisis but acknowledged that his belief in deregulation had been shaken". Although many Republican lawmakers tried to blame the housing bubble on Fannie Mae and Freddie Mac, Greenspan placed far more blame on Wall Street for bundling subprime mortgages into securities.

=== 2008 financial crisis and the Great Recession ===
In March 2008, Greenspan wrote an article for the Financial Times' Economists' Forum in which he said that the 2008 financial crisis in the United States is likely to be judged as the most wrenching since the end of World War II. In it, he argued: "We will never be able to anticipate all discontinuities in financial markets." He concluded: "It is important, indeed crucial, that any reforms in, and adjustments to, the structure of markets and regulation not inhibit our most reliable and effective safeguards against cumulative economic failure: market flexibility and open competition." The article attracted a number of critical responses from forum contributors, who, finding causation between Greenspan's policies and the discontinuities in financial markets that followed, criticized Greenspan mainly for what many believed to be his unbalanced and immovable ideological suppositions about global capitalism and free competitive markets.

Greenspan responded to his critics in a follow-up article in which he defended his ideology as applied to his conceptual and policy framework, which, among other things, prohibited him from exerting real pressure against the burgeoning housing bubble or, in his words, "leaning against the wind". Greenspan argued, "My view of the range of dispersion of outcomes has been shaken, but not my judgment that free competitive markets are by far the unrivaled way to organize economies". He concluded: "We have tried regulation ranging from heavy to central planning. None meaningfully worked. Do we wish to retest the evidence?" Financial Times associate editor and chief economics commentator Martin Wolf defended Greenspan primarily as a scapegoat for the market turmoil.

However, an October 15, 2008, article in The Washington Post analyzing the origins of the economic crisis claims that Greenspan vehemently opposed any regulation of derivatives, and actively sought to undermine the office of the Commodity Futures Trading Commission when the commission sought to initiate regulation of derivatives. Meanwhile, Greenspan recommended improving mark-to-market regulations to avoid derivatives and other complex assets being marked to a distressed or illiquid market during the material adverse conditions seen in the late 2000s credit crisis.

Greenspan was not alone in his opposition to derivatives regulation. In a 1999 government report that was a key driver in the passage of the Commodity Futures Modernization Act of 2000—legislation that clarified that most over-the-counter derivatives were outside the regulatory authority of any government agency—Greenspan was joined by Treasury Secretary Lawrence Summers, Securities and Exchange Commission Chairman Arthur Levitt, and Commodity Futures Trading Commission Chairman William Ranier in concluding that "under many circumstances, the trading of financial derivatives by eligible swap participants should be excluded from the CEA" (Commodity Exchange Act). Other government agencies also supported that view.

In Congressional testimony on October 23, 2008, Greenspan acknowledged that he was "partially" wrong in opposing regulation and stated, "Those of us who have looked to the self-interest of lending institutions to protect shareholders' equity—myself especially—are in a state of shocked disbelief." Referring to his free-market ideology, Greenspan said: "I have found a flaw. I don't know how significant or permanent it is. But I have been very distressed by that fact." Representative Henry Waxman (D-CA) pressed him to clarify his words. "In other words, you found that your view of the world, your ideology, was not right, it was not working," Waxman said. "Absolutely, precisely", Greenspan replied. "You know, that's precisely the reason I was shocked, because I have been going for 40 years or more with very considerable evidence that it was working exceptionally well." Greenspan admitted fault in opposing regulation of derivatives and acknowledged that financial institutions didn't protect shareholders and investments as well as he expected.

Matt Taibbi described the Greenspan put and its bad consequences saying: "every time the banks blew up a speculative bubble, they could go back to the Fed and borrow money at zero or one or two percent, and then start the game all over", thereby making it "almost impossible" for the banks to lose money. He also called Greenspan a "classic con man" who, through political savvy, "flattered and bullshitted his way up the Matterhorn of American power and ... jacked himself off to the attention of Wall Street for 20 consecutive years".

In the documentary film Inside Job, Greenspan is cited as one of the persons responsible for the 2008 financial crisis. He is also named in Time magazine as one of the "25 People to Blame for the Financial Crisis".

During the testimony, Greenspan admitted that he had lost his understanding of how the system works. This led the philosopher Bernard Stiegler to say that he got proletarianized, meaning that he got deskilled by delegating his knowledge to machines.

=== Political views and alleged politicization of office ===
Greenspan described himself as a "lifelong libertarian Republican". Some free-market critics argue that Greenspan abandoned his libertarian ideals as Federal Reserve Chair. Greenspan was once a proponent of sound money and limited government, but later backed policies that ran counter to these principles, such as prolonged artificially low interest rates. Critics argue that these policies contributed to asset bubbles and moral hazard.

In March 2005, in reaction to Greenspan's support of President George W. Bush's plan to partially privatize Social Security, then-Democratic Senate Minority Leader Harry Reid attacked Greenspan as "one of the biggest political hacks we have in Washington" and criticized him for supporting Bush's 2001 tax cut plan. Then-Democratic House Minority Leader Nancy Pelosi added that there were serious questions about the Fed's independence as a result of Greenspan's public statements.

Greenspan also received criticism from Democratic Congressman Barney Frank and others for supporting Bush's Social Security plans favoring private accounts. Greenspan had said Bush's model has "the seeds of developing full funding by its very nature. As I've said before, I've always supported moves to full funding in the context of a private account".

Others, like Republican Senator Mitch McConnell, disagreed that Greenspan was too deferential to Bush, stating that Greenspan "has been an independent player at the Fed for a long time under both parties and made an enormous positive contribution".

Economist Paul Krugman wrote that Greenspan was a "three-card maestro" with a "lack of sincerity" who, "by repeatedly shilling for whatever the Bush administration wants, has betrayed the trust placed in the Fed chairman".

Republican Senator Jim Bunning, who opposed Greenspan's fifth reconfirmation, charged that Greenspan should comment only on monetary policy, not fiscal policy. Greenspan had used his position as Fed chairman to comment upon fiscal policy as early as 1993, however, when he supported President Clinton's deficit reduction plan, which included tax increases and budget cuts.

In an October 2011 lecture addressing the Occupy movement, Noam Chomsky characterized portions of Greenspan's February 1997 testimony to the U.S. Senate as an example of the self-serving attitudes of the so-called 1%. In that testimony, Greenspan had stated that growing worker insecurity is a significant factor keeping inflation and inflation expectations low, thereby promoting long-term investment.

== Personal life ==
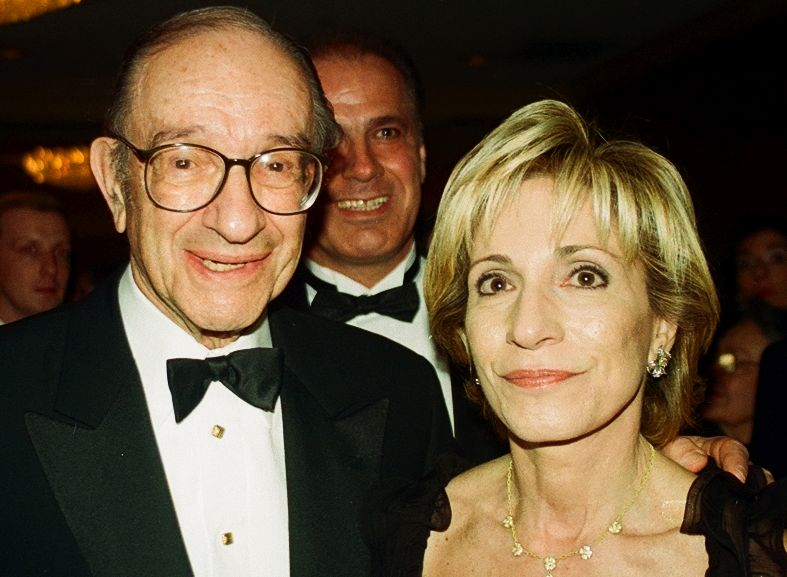
Greenspan and wife Andrea Mitchell in 2000

Greenspan married artist Joan Mitchell in October 1952, but they had the marriage annulled 10 months later. He dated newswoman Barbara Walters of ABC News in the late 1970s.

In December 1984, Greenspan began dating journalist Andrea Mitchell of NBC News. At the time, Greenspan was 58 and Mitchell was 38. In April 1997, they were married by U.S. Supreme Court Justice Ruth Bader Ginsburg.

=== Death ===
Greenspan died from complications of Parkinson's disease at his home in Washington, D.C., on June 22, 2026, at the age of 100. Following his death, the Federal Reserve remembered Greenspan: "Under his leadership, the Federal Reserve achieved a sustained era of price stability that supported economic growth and helped anchor the public's confidence in the institution".

== Legacy ==
In their obituary of Greenspan, The New York Times called Greenspan the "pre-eminent economic policymaker of his time" and a "skilled political operator". NPR said that Greenspan was "the rare celebrity among central bankers" who was "lionized" for his economic stewardship in the 1990s. Greenspan was noted for being a "maestro" of the economic boom of the 1990s; however, he is also noted for being one of the figures responsible for the 2008 financial crisis and subsequent recession. The BBC called Greenspan the "architect of the modern American economy", noting that during his tenure as Federal Reserve Chair, he was called the "God in the machine" of American finance. However, his belief in the financial markets' ability to regulate themselves and his support for deregulation were seen as key factors leading to the financial crisis.

Greenspan's tenure as Federal Chair was also noted for its global influence. The Wall Street Journal remarked that Greenspan had "rivaled" the U.S. presidency for global influence at times. He was said to have exercised significant influence over American finance and commerce with maintaining global influence. In 1996 he became famous for the phrase "irrational exuberance" which he used in a speech intended to warn of what became the dot-com bubble. His remark had a successful immediate effect on dampening world stock markets but in the longer term was ineffective.

== Honors ==
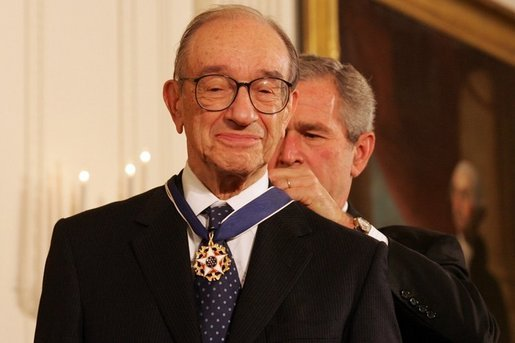
President George W. Bush presents the Presidential Medal of Freedom to Alan Greenspan, on November 9, 2005, in the East Room of the White House.

- Presidential Medal of Freedom The highest civilian award in the United States, by President George W. Bush in November 2005.
- Department of Defense Medal for Distinguished Public Service January 23, 2006.
- Commander of the Legion of Honour (France) 2000.
- Knight Commander of the Order of the British Empire (United Kingdom), September 22, 2002, bestowed by Queen Elizabeth II.

In 1976, Greenspan received the U.S. Senator John Heinz Award for Greatest Public Service by an Elected or Appointed Official, an award given out annually by Jefferson Awards.

In 1989, Greenspan was elected as a fellow of the American Statistical Association.

Greenspan was elected to the American Philosophical Society in 2000.

In 2004, Greenspan received the Dwight D. Eisenhower Medal for Leadership and Service, from Eisenhower Fellowships. In 2005, he became the first recipient of the Harry S. Truman Medal for Economic Policy, presented by the Harry S. Truman Library Institute. In 2007, Greenspan was the recipient of the inaugural Thomas Jefferson Foundation Medal in Citizen Leadership, presented by the University of Virginia.

On April 19, 2012, Greenspan received the Eugene J. Keogh Award for Distinguished Public Service from NYU.

=== Honorary Degrees ===
Location	Date	School	Degree	Gave Commencement Address
Indiana	May 21, 1995	University of Notre Dame	Doctor of Laws (LL.D)	
Pennsylvania	1998	University of Pennsylvania	Doctor of Laws (LL.D)	
Massachusetts	June 10, 1999	Harvard University	Doctor of Laws (LL.D)	Yes
Connecticut	1999	Yale University	Doctor of Humane Letters (DHL)	
Scotland	2005	University of Edinburgh	Doctorate	
New York	December 14, 2005	New York University	Doctor of Commercial Science	

== Selected books ==
- The Quotations of Chairman Greenspan: Words from the Man Who Can Shake the World (2000)
- The Age of Turbulence: Adventures in a New World (2007)
- Finance and Economics Discussion Series: Sources and Uses of Equity Extracted from Homes (2013)
- The Map and the Territory 2.0: Risk, Human Nature, and the Future of Forecasting (2014)
- Capitalism in America: A History (2018)

== See also ==
- List of centenarians (politicians and civil servants)
- List of United States political appointments across party lines

Political offices
Preceded by Herbert Stein	Chair of the Council of Economic Advisers; 1974–1977	Succeeded by Charles Schultze
Preceded by Paul Volcker	Member of the Federal Reserve Board of Governors; 1987–2006	Succeeded by Ben Bernanke
Preceded by Paul Volcker	Chair of the Federal Reserve; 1987–2006	Succeeded by Ben Bernanke
