= Steven Pearlstein =

American journalist

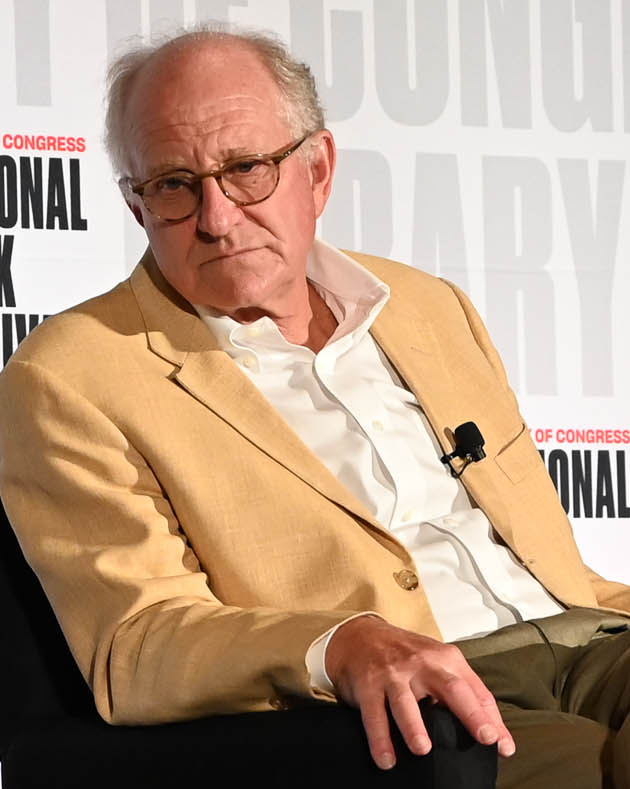
- Steven Pearlstein at the 2019 National Book Festival
- Education: Trinity College
- Occupation: columnist
- Spouse: Wendy Gray
- Awards: Gerald Loeb Award (2006); Pulitzer Prize for Commentary (2008); Gerald Loeb Lifetime Achievement (2011)

Steven Pearlstein is an American columnist who wrote on business and the economy in a column published twice weekly in The Washington Post. His tenure at the WaPo ended on March 3, 2021. Pearlstein received the 2008 Pulitzer Prize for Commentary for "his insightful columns that explore the nation's complex economic ills with masterful clarity" at The Washington Post. In the fall of 2011, he became the Robinson Professor of Political and International Affairs at George Mason University.

== Education ==
Pearlstein was raised in Brookline, Massachusetts. In 1973, he graduated from Trinity College, Hartford.

== Career ==
He started out in journalism at the Concord Monitor and the Foster's Daily Democrat, in New Hampshire. He was the founding publisher and editor of The Boston Observer, a monthly journal of liberal opinion, and was a senior editor at Inc. magazine for two years. Pearlstein then joined The Washington Post, where he has served as deputy business editor.

Pearlstein worked as a television news reporter at Boston’s public television station, WGBH-TV. During the late 1970s, he served as administrative assistant to U.S. Senator John A. Durkin and U.S. Representative Michael J. Harrington and was elected to the position of town moderator in West Newbury, Massachusetts.

He shared the 2006 Gerald Loeb Award for Commentary, and received the Gerald Loeb Lifetime Award in 2011.

In 2018, he published a work of nonfiction, Can American Capitalism Survive?: Why Greed Is Not Good, Opportunity Is Not Equal, and Fairness Won't Make Us Poor.

== Personal life ==
As of 2008 he lives in Washington, D.C., with his wife, Wendy Gray, and two children.

== See also ==
- Greenspan put
