= Everything bubble =

2020–2021 correlated bubble in assets

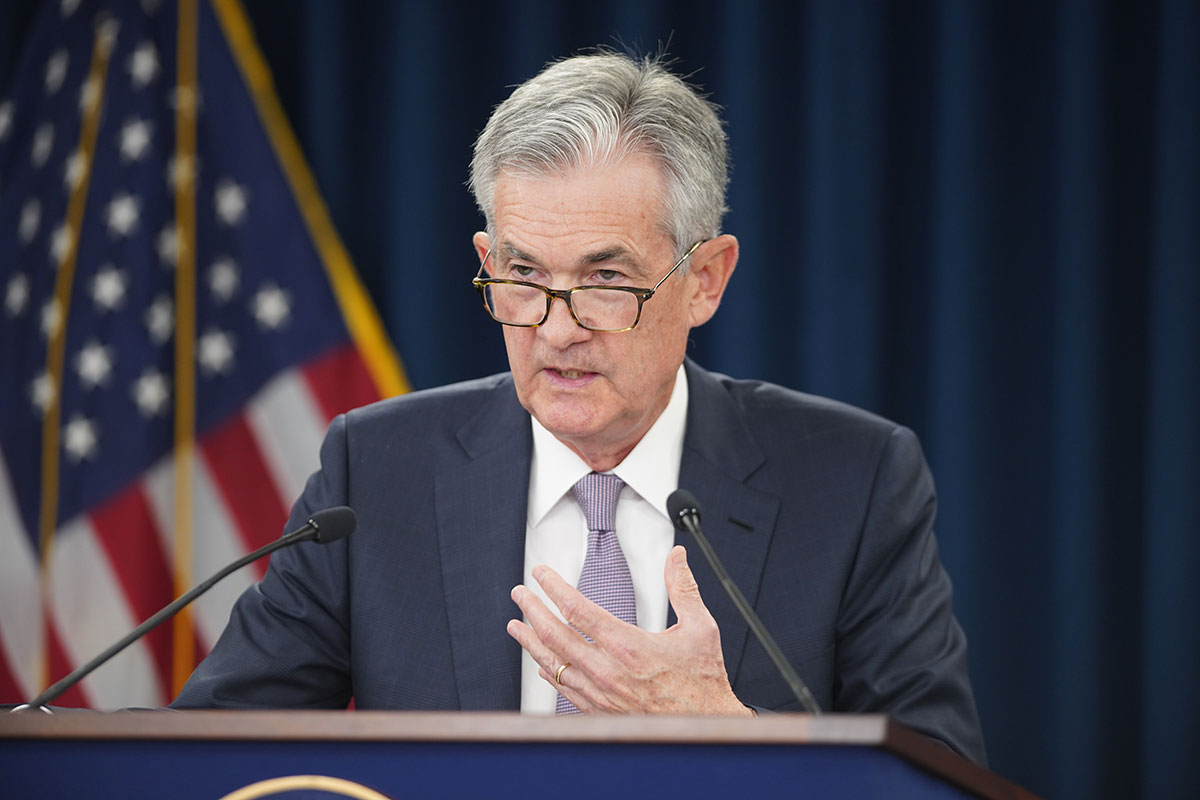
Powell defends his first major monetary easing at a press conference, September 2019.

High up on his [President Biden's] list, will be dealing with the consequences of the biggest financial bubble in U.S. history. Why the biggest? Because it encompasses not just stocks but pretty much every other financial asset too. And for that, you may thank the Federal Reserve.

— Richard Cookson, Bloomberg (February 2021)

The "everything bubble" refers to the impact on the values of asset prices, including equities, real estate, bonds, many commodities, and cryptocurrencies, due to quantitative easing by the Federal Reserve, European Central Bank, and the Bank of Japan. The policy itself and the techniques of direct and indirect methods of quantitative easing used to execute it are sometimes referred to as the central bank put. The term "everything bubble" first came in use during the Federal Reserve chairmanship of Janet Yellen, but it is most associated with the quantitative easing during the COVID-19 pandemic by Jerome Powell.

The everything bubble notably occurred despite the COVID-19 recession, the China–United States trade war, and political turmoil – leading to a realization that the bubble was a central bank creation, with concerns on the independence and integrity of market pricing, and on the Fed's impact on wealth inequality.

In 2022, financial historian Edward Chancellor said "central banks' unsustainable policies have created an 'everything bubble', leaving the global economy with an inflation 'hangover'". Rising inflation did ultimately force the Fed to tighten financial conditions during 2022 (i.e. raising interest rates and employing quantitative tightening), and in June 2022, The Wall Street Journal wrote that the Fed had "pricked the Everything Bubble". In the same month, financial journalist Rana Foroohar told The New York Times, "Welcome to the End of the 'Everything Bubble'". An article in The Guardian in October 2022 said that "In recent months, it has become clear that the “everything bubble” is over, pricked by the tightening of policy by central banks in response to higher inflation". An article in The Economist in July 2023 noted that the everything bubble popped in 2022 but that asset prices were once again resilient.

== History ==
=== Origin ===
The term first appeared in 2014, during the chairmanship of Janet Yellen, and reflected her strategy of applying prolonged monetary looseness (e.g. the Yellen put of continual low-interest rates and direct quantitative easing), as a method of boosting near-term economic growth via asset price inflation.

The term came to greater prominence during the subsequent chairmanship of Jerome Powell, initially during Powell's first monetary easing in Q4 2019 (the Powell put), but more substantially during the 2020–2021 coronavirus pandemic, when Powell embraced asset bubbles to combat the financial impact of the pandemic. By early 2021, Powell had created the loosest financial conditions ever recorded, and most US assets were simultaneously at levels of valuation that matched their highest individual levels in economic history. Powell rejected the claim that US assets were definitively in a bubble, invoking the Fed model, (Note: The Fed model is a disputed form of equity valuation which has been challenged by academics, and particularly at very low yields. A notable example is post-1990s Japan when ultra-low yields did not stop Japanese equity valuations from dropping substantially for decades, only stopping when the Bank of Japan started directly buying equities to support their price.) to assert that ultra-low yields justified higher asset prices. Powell also rejected criticism that the scale of the asset bubbles had widened US wealth inequality to levels not seen since the 1920s, on the basis that the asset bubbles would themselves promote job growth, thus reducing the inequality. The contrast between the distress experienced by "Main Street" during the pandemic, and the economic boom experienced by "Wall Street", who had one of their most profitable years in history, was controversial, and earned Powell the title of Wall Street's Dr. Feelgood.

Powell was supported by Congress, with speaker Nancy Pelosi saying in October 2020, "Well, let me just say that the number, I think, that is staggering is that we have more people unemployed and on unemployment benefits than any time in our country's history. We know that the Fed is shoring up the markets so that the stock market can do well. I don't complain about that, I want the market to do well."

=== Peak in 2021 ===
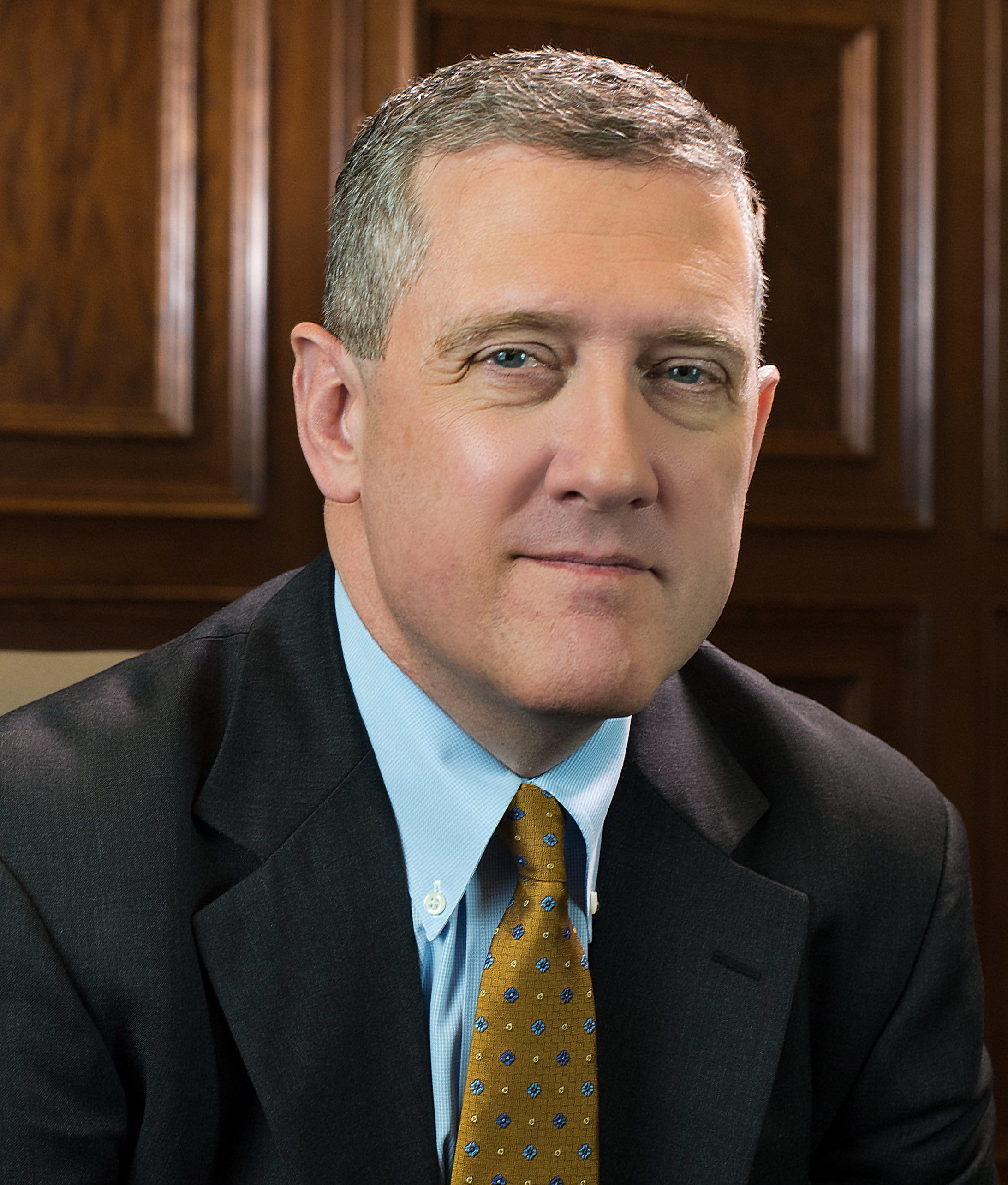
In February 2021, the Fed's Bullard said he did not see a bubble: "That's just normal investing".

In early 2021, some market participants warned that Powell's everything bubble had reached dangerous levels. Investor Jeremy Grantham said, "All three of Powell's predecessors claimed that the asset prices they helped inflate in turn aided the economy through the wealth effect", before eventually collapsing. Investor Seth Klarman said that the Fed had "broken the market", and that "the market's usual role in price discovery had been suspended". Economist Mohamed El-Erian said "you have such an enormous disconnect between fundamentals and valuations", and that the record highs in assets were due to the actions of the Fed and the ECB, clarifying "That is the reason why we've seen prices going from one record high to another despite completely changing narratives. Forget about the 'great reopening', the 'Trump trade' and all this other stuff". The Financial Times warned that the inequality from Powell's K-shaped recovery could lead to political and social instability, saying: "The majority of people are suffering, amid a Great Gatsby-style boom at the top".

Several commentators called the 2020–2021 market created by Powell as being the most speculative market ever seen, including CNBC host Jim Cramer who said: "You can't lose in that market", and "it's like a slot machine" that always pays out. "I've not seen this in my career". Bloomberg said: "Animal spirits are famously running wild across Wall Street, but crunch the numbers and this bull market is even crazier than it seems" ("Animal spirits" is a term popularized in the 1930s by economist John Maynard Keynes to describe the influence of human emotions on finance and investing). The extreme level of speculation led to the GameStop short squeeze in January 2021, the five-fold rise in the Goldman Sachs Non-Profitable Technology Index, and the record rise in the Russell Microcap Index. At the end of January 2021, The Wall Street Journal wrote that: "For once, everyone seems to agree: Much of the market looks like it's in a bubble", while Goldman Sachs said that the S&P 500 was at or near its most expensive levels in history on most measures, with the forward EV/EBITDA breaking 17× for the first time.

In February 2021, the Fed Governor James B. Bullard said that they did not see an asset bubble and would continue to apply a high level of monetary stimulus. Bloomberg News wrote that Powell, in the final year of his first term, was afraid to tighten in case of a repeat of tightening mistakes in the fourth quarter of 2018. The Financial Times warned US regulators to regard the experience of the 2015–2016 Chinese stock market turbulence, when monetary easing by the Chinese state in 2014 led to a bubble, but then a crash over 2015–2016, in Chinese markets. In February 2021, the former head of the BOJ financial markets division warned that the BOJ should adjust the level of direct purchases it makes of Nikkei ETFs due to bubble concerns. (Note: The Bank of Japan is the largest owner of Japanese shares through direct daily purchases of Nikkei ETFs, leading to questions over the integrity of the pricing of Japanese securities, and their long-term viability.)

=== Popping of bubble in 2022 ===
By early 2022, rising inflation forced Powell, and latterly other central banks, to significantly tighten financial conditions including raising interest rates and quantitative tightening (the opposite of quantitative easing), which led to a synchronized fall across most asset prices (i.e. the opposite effect to the 'everything bubble'). In May 2022, financial historian Edward Chancellor told Fortune that "central banks' unsustainable policies have created an 'everything bubble', leaving the global economy with an inflation 'hangover'". Chancellor separately noted to Reuters, "If ultralow interest rates were responsible for inflating an 'everything bubble', it follows that everything – well, almost everything – is at risk from rising rates". In June 2022, James Mackintosh of The Wall Street Journal wrote that the Fed had "pricked the Everything Bubble", while in the same month the financial journalist Rana Foroohar told the New York Times, "Welcome to the End of the 'Everything Bubble'".

== Asset valuations at record levels ==
The post-2020 period of the everything bubble produced several simultaneous US records/near-records for extreme levels in a diverse range of asset valuation and financial speculation metrics:

=== General ===
- In December 2020, the Goldman Sachs GFCI Global Financial Conditions Index (a measure of US monetary looseness), dropped below 98 for the first time in its history (since 1987).
- In January 2021, the Citibank Panic/Euphoria Index hit broke 2.0 for the first time since its inception in 1988, surpassing the previous dot-com peak of 1.5.
- In February 2021, the ratio of margin debt-to-cash in Wall Street trading accounts hit 172%, just below the historical peak of 179% set in March 2000.
- In February 2021, the Congressional Budget Office estimated that US Federal Public Debt held by the public would hit 102% of US GDP, just below the historic all-time high of 105% in 1946.

=== Bonds ===
- In January 2021, the Sherman Ratio (the yield per unit of bond duration), known as the "Bond Market's Scariest Gauge", hit an all-time low of 0.1968 for the US Corporate Bond Index.
- In February 2021, the yield on the US junk bond index dropped below 4% for the first time in history (the historical default rate going back to the 1980s is 4–5% per annum).

=== Equities ===
- In January 2021, Goldman Sachs recorded that the forward EV/EBITDA of the S&P 500 had passed 17× on an aggregate basis, and 15.5× for the median stock, for the first time in history (note that the price-earnings ratio was less comparable due to the 2018 reduction in the US corporate tax from 39% to 21%).
- By January 2021, the short-interest on the S&P 500 dropped to 1.6%, matching the record low of 2000; the "most-shorted US stocks" outperformed by the largest margin in history in 2020.
- In January 2021, the ratio of US corporate insider share sales-to-purchases ratio hit an all-time high of 7.8× (i.e. 7.8 times more corporate executives sold their company's stock than purchased it).
- In February 2021, the Buffett indicator, being the ratio of the total value of the US stock market (as defined by the Wilshire 5000) to US GDP, set an all-time high above 200%, surpassing the previous dot.com peak of 159.2% (and the 2009 low of 66.7%). In 2001, Warren Buffett said: "If the ratio approaches 200%—as it did in 1999 and a part of 2000—you are playing with fire".
- In February 2021, the Price–sales ratio of US stocks hit an all-time high of 2.95×, surpassing its dot.com peak of 2.45× (and the 2009 low of 0.8×).
- In February 2021, the P/B ratio of US stocks hit an all-time high of 14×, surpassing its peak during the dot-com bubble of 9× (and the 2009 low of 3×).
- In February 2021, the US equity put/call ratio, hit 0.40×, almost matching the March 2000 low of 0.39× (a low ratio means market sentiment is optimistic).
- In February 2021, the combined capitalization of the top five stocks in the S&P 500 (being Apple, Microsoft, Amazon, Tesla and Meta Platforms) was 21% of the index, surpassing the prior March 2000 peak of 18% (being Microsoft, Cisco, General Electric, Intel and ExxonMobil).
- In February 2021, a record 14 members of the Russell Microcap Index, and a record 302 members of the Russell 2000 Index were larger than the smallest member of the S&P 500 Index.

=== Housing ===
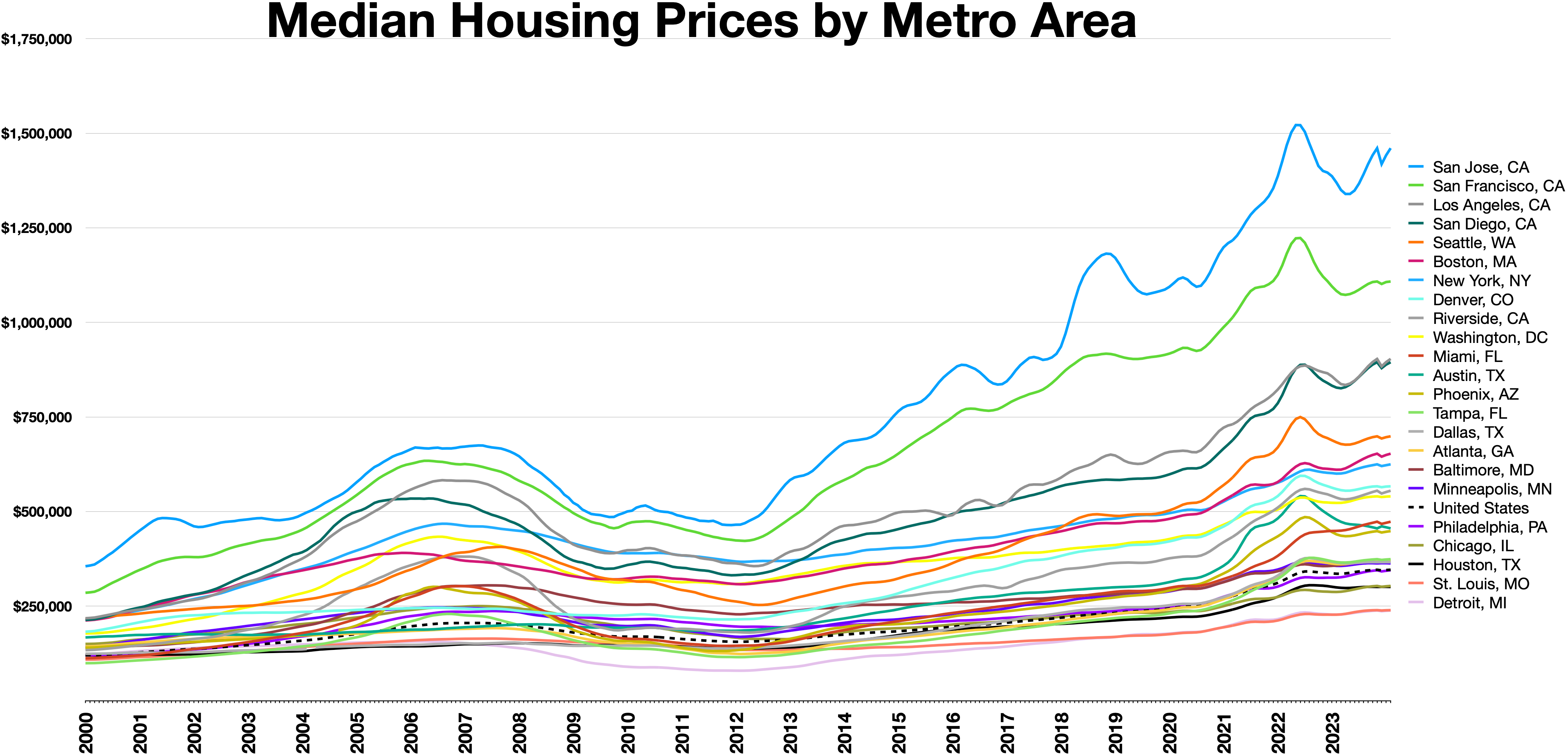
Median housing price by metro area

- In November 2020, the Robert J. Shiller cyclically adjusted price-to-earnings ratio for US housing, hit 43.9×, just 1.7% below its all-time record of 45.6× set in 2006.

=== Cryptocurrencies ===
- In January 2021, the total value of cryptocurrencies passed US$1 trillion for the first time in history, with most currencies setting new highs in value.
- In February 2021, bitcoin surpassed US$50,000 per unit for the first time in history.

=== SPACs ===
- In 2020, a record 248 special-purpose acquisition company (SPACs) raised US$83 billion in new capital in initial public offerings; and by Q1 2021, a further record US$30 billion was raised in a single quarter. SPACs are notoriously poor-performing assets, whose returns 3-years after merging are almost uniformly heavily negative; their proliferation is a signal of an economic bubble.

=== Commodities ===
- In July 2020, gold futures rose above US$2,000 per ounce level for the first time in history.
- In August 2020, lumber prices, as defined by the CME one-month futures contract, broke the old historic record high of US$651 per thousand board feet, to reach US$1711 in May 2021.

== Alleged examples ==
As well as the above asset-level records, several assets with extreme valuations and extraordinary price increases were identified as being emblematic of the everything bubble:

- Ark Innovation ETF, American exchange-traded fund, and major investor in Tesla and other technology firms.
- Goldman Sachs Non-Profitable US Technology Index, a proprietary index of US technology firms that were loss-making.
- Russell Microcap Index stocks, the smallest listed US stocks where a record number grew in a short period past the size of the smallest S&P 500 stock.
- S&P Clean Energy Index, proprietary index of (mostly) US clean energy firms whose P/E ratio tripled, in February 2021.
- The stock price of Tesla Inc. in 2020 and 2021

== See also ==
- Criticism of the Federal Reserve
- K-shaped recovery
- Fed model
- Greenspan put
- Stock market bubble
