= Jeremy Grantham =

British businessman (born 1938)

- Born: Robert Jeremy Goltho Grantham; 6 October 1938 (age 88); Ware, Hertfordshire, England
- Education: University of Sheffield; Harvard Business School
- Occupation: Co-founder of GMO LLC
- Spouse: Hannelore Grantham

Robert Jeremy Goltho Grantham CBE (born 6 October 1938) is a British investor and co-founder and chief investment strategist of GMO LLC, a Boston-based asset management firm. GMO had more than US$118 billion in assets under management as of March 2015. This number dropped to $65 billion as of December 2020. Grantham has been a vocal critic of various governmental responses to the 2008 financial crisis. He started one of the world's first index funds in the early 1970s.

In 2011, he was included in the 50 Most Influential ranking of Bloomberg Markets magazine.

== Early life ==
Grantham was born on 6 October 1938 in Ware, Hertfordshire, and grew up in Doncaster. He studied economics at the University of Sheffield. In 1966, he completed an MBA at Harvard Business School.

== Investment philosophy ==
Grantham's investment philosophy can be summarised by his commonly used phrase "reversion to the mean". Essentially, he believes that all asset classes and markets will revert to mean historical levels from highs and lows. His firm seeks to understand historical changes in markets and predict results for seven years into the future. When there is deviation from historical means (averages), the firm may take an investment position based on anticipated return to the mean. The firm allocates assets based on internal predictions of market direction.

Grantham has been described as a contrarian investor and permabear. He named his 2026 book about booms and busts of the past half century The Making of a Permabear: The Perils of Long-term Investing in a Short-term World. It was co-written with Edward Chancellor.

In 1971, Grantham helped established one of the earliest index funds at Batterymarch Financial Management. The idea was unusual at the time and the fund was not a success.

== Opinions and perspectives ==
=== Views on market bubbles and the 2007–2008 credit crisis ===
Grantham built much of his investing reputation over the course of his career by identifying speculative asset bubbles as they were unfolding. He avoided investing in Japanese equities and real estate in the late 1980s during the peak of the Japanese asset price bubble, and avoided technology stocks during the Internet bubble of the 1990s. A decade later, he limited his exposure to the housing bubble. In 2010, Elizabeth Leary wrote in Kiplinger that analysis of his past newsletters confirms many of Grantham's predictions. In a 2021 interview, Grantham distinguished between identifying overpriced asset bubbles (which he believes is not particularly difficult) and predicting when such bubbles will collapse (which he admits is impossible, saying only that asset bubbles end at some point). Grantham also acknowledged that his strategy can underperform market averages for years, testing his clients' patience, but said his strategy has always paid off long-term by avoiding overvalued assets.

In GMO's April 2010 Quarterly Letter, Grantham spoke to the tendency of all bubbles to revert to the mean:

For the record, I wrote an article for Fortune published in September 2007 that referred to three "near certainties": profit margins would come down, the housing market would break, and the risk-premium all over the world would widen, each with severe consequences. You can perhaps only have that degree of confidence if you have been to the history books as much as we have and looked at every bubble and every bust. We have found that there are no exceptions. We are up to 34 completed bubbles. Every single one of them has broken all the way back to the trend that existed prior to the bubble forming, which is a very tough standard. So it's simply illogical to give up the really high probabilities involved at the asset class level. All the data errors that frighten us all at the individual stock level are washed away at these great aggregations. It's simply more reliable, higher-quality data.

In his Fall 2008 GMO Letter, Grantham commented on his evaluation of the underlying causes of the then-ongoing world credit crisis:

To avoid the development of crises, you need a plentiful supply of foresight, imagination, and competence. A few quarters ago I likened our financial system to an elaborate suspension bridge, hopefully built with some good, old-fashioned Victorian over-engineering. Well, it wasn't over-engineered! It was built to do just one under favorable conditions. Now with hurricanes blowing, the Corps of Engineers, as it were, are working around the clock to prop up a suspiciously jerry-built edifice. When a crisis occurs, you need competence and courage to deal with it. The bitterest disappointment of this crisis has been how completely the build-up of the bubbles in asset prices and risk-taking was rationalized and ignored by the authorities, especially the formerly esteemed Chairman of the Fed.

I ask myself, 'Why is it that several dozen people saw this crisis coming for years?' I described it as being like watching a train wreck in very slow motion. It seemed so inevitable and so merciless, and yet the bosses of Merrill Lynch and Citi and even U.S. Treasury Secretary Hank Paulson and Fed chairman Ben Bernanke – none of them seemed to see it coming.

I have a theory that people who find themselves running major-league companies are real organization-management types who focus on what they are doing this quarter or this annual budget. They are somewhat impatient, and focused on the present. Seeing these things requires more people with a historical perspective who are more thoughtful and more right-brained – but we end up with an army of left-brained immediate doers.

So it's more or less guaranteed that every time we get an outlying, obscure event that has never happened before in history, they are always going to miss it. And the three or four-dozen-odd characters screaming about it are always going to be ignored. ...

So we kept putting organization people – people who can influence and persuade and cajole – into top jobs that once-in-a-blue-moon take great creativity and historical insight. But they don't have those skills.

Grantham focused on personal traits and leadership in trying to explain how we reached the economic crisis.

=== Fossil fuels and the Keystone pipeline ===
Grantham has repeatedly said that the rising cost of energy—the most fundamental commodity—between 2002 and 2008 falsely inflated economic growth and GDP figures worldwide and that we have been in a "carbon bubble" for approximately the last 250 years, during which energy was very cheap. He believes this bubble is coming to an end. He has stated his opposition to the Keystone Pipeline on the basis of the environmental consequences its construction will bring to Alberta and the planet due to the contribution that burning the extracted oil would make to climate change.

=== Timber investment ===
Grantham is a strong advocate for investments in the timber industry, which also relies on trees for biomass/biofuel (woodchips). The potential conflict of interest with Grantham's philanthropic engagement for the "beyond coal" campaign of the Sierra Club is criticized in Jeff Gibbs's documentary Planet of the Humans.

=== Resource limitations ===
In his April 2011 Quarterly Letter, Grantham reminded investors to be aware of impending resource limitations, arguing that they should start "to recognize that we now live in a different, more constrained, world in which prices of raw materials will rise and shortages will be common": in essence, "the days of abundant resources and falling prices are over forever".

== Philanthropy ==
Grantham and his wife, Hannelore, established the Grantham Foundation For the Protection of the Environment in 1997. Substantial commitments have been made to Imperial College London, the London School of Economics, and the University of Sheffield to establish the Grantham Institute – Climate Change and Environment, the Grantham Research Institute on Climate Change and the Environment, and the Grantham Centre for Sustainable Futures, respectively, which will enable the institutions to build on their extensive expertise in climate change research. The Grantham Foundation for the Protection of the Environment's 2011 tax filing shows the Foundation donated $1 million to both the Sierra Club and to The Nature Conservancy and $2 million to the Environmental Defense Fund that year. The Foundation has also supported Greenpeace, the World Wide Fund for Nature, Rare, and the Smithsonian. From 2006 to 2012, The Grantham Foundation for Protection of the Environment funded a $75,000 prize for environmental journalism. It was administered by the University of Rhode Island's Metcalf Institute for Marine & Environmental Reporting.

In August 2019, Grantham dedicated 98% (approximately $1 billion) of his personal wealth to fight climate change. He believes that green technologies are profitable investments in the long run, claiming that decarbonizing the economy will be an investing bonanza for those who know it's coming.

== Awards and honours ==
Grantham was elected a member of the American Academy of Arts and Sciences. With his wife, Hannelore, he received the Carnegie Medal for Philanthropy.

He was appointed Commander of the Order of the British Empire (CBE) in the 2016 Birthday Honours for philanthropic service to climate change research.

- 2009 Honorary degree, Imperial College London.
- 2010 Honorary degree, The New School, New York.
- 2012 Honorary degree, University of Sheffield.

== See also ==
- Edward Chancellor, worked with Grantham at GMO
- Everything bubble
