= Easy money policy =

Monetary policy that increases the money supply usually by lowering interest rates

An easy money policy is a monetary policy that increases the money supply usually by lowering interest rates. It occurs when a country's central bank decides to allow new cash flows into the banking system. Since interest rates are lower, it is easier for banks and lenders to loan money, thus likely leading to increased economic growth.

== Effects ==
The most immediate effect of easy money, if implemented when the economy is below capacity, may be increased economic growth. In addition, the value of securities rises in the short term. If prolonged, the policy affects the business sentiment of firms and can reverse course over fears of rampant inflation. This is an effect of forward-looking expectations.

== Criticism ==
As a policy, easy money underpins the economic thought of John Maynard Keynes, and has been criticized by advocates of public choice theory and by New Classical economists.

A study conducted by S.P. Kothari of the MIT Sloan School of Management, which looked at the growth rate of aggregated fixed investment by American companies between 1952 and 2010 found little evidence to support the notion that lowering short term interest rates stimulates corporate investment. His findings illustrate why reducing the Fed's policy of keeping low interest rates has not had the desired effect.

== See also ==
- Everything bubble
- Fed put
