= Greenspan put =

Monetary policy tool

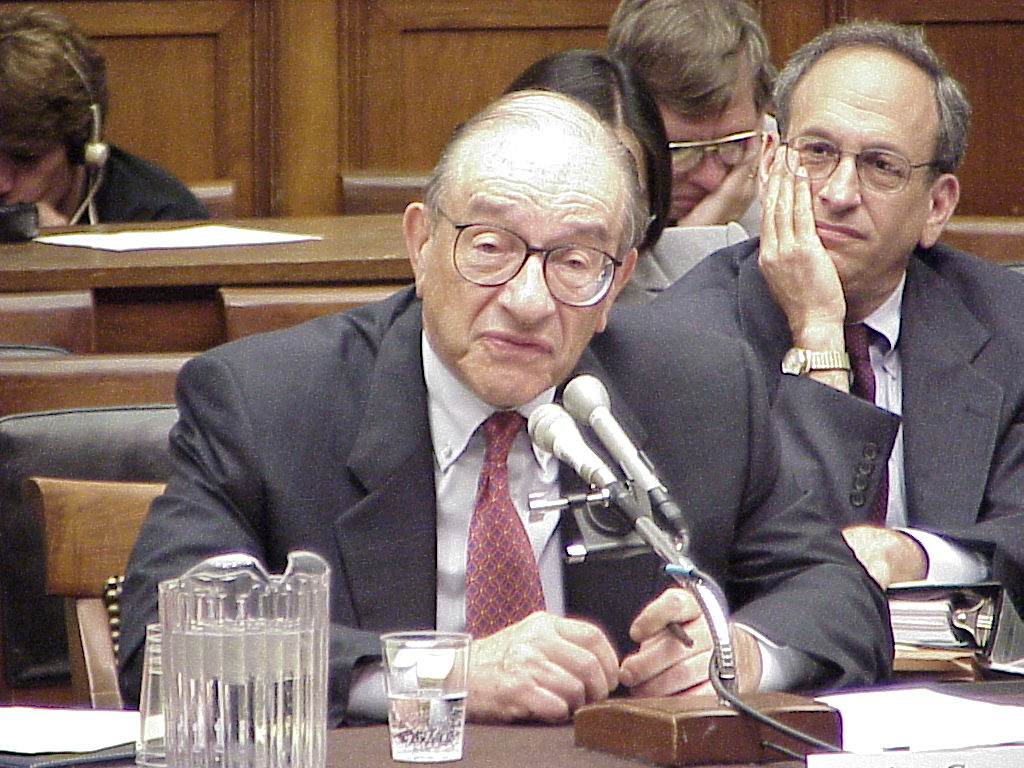
Alan Greenspan in 2005

The Greenspan put was a monetary policy that Alan Greenspan, during his tenure as chair of the Federal Reserve, exercised in response to financial crises. It was used for the first time with the crash of 1987. Though it was successful in addressing various crises, it became controversial as it led to periods of extreme speculation led by Wall Street investment banks overusing the put's repurchase agreements (or indirect quantitative easing) and creating successive asset price bubbles. The banks so overused Greenspan's tools that their compromised solvency in the 2008 financial crisis required Federal Reserve ("Fed") chair Ben Bernanke to use direct quantitative easing (the Bernanke put). The term Yellen put was used to refer to Fed chair Janet Yellen's policy of perpetual monetary looseness (i.e. low interest rates and continual quantitative easing).

In the fourth quarter of 2019, Fed chair Jerome Powell recreated the Greenspan put by providing repurchase agreements to Wall Street investment banks as a way to boost falling asset prices; in 2020, to combat the financial effects of the COVID-19 pandemic, Powell re-introduced the Bernanke put with direct quantitative easing to boost asset prices. In November 2020, Bloomberg noted that the Powell put was stronger than both the Greenspan put or the Bernanke put, while Time noted that the scale of Powell's monetary intervention in 2020 and the tolerance of multiple asset bubbles as a side-effect of such intervention "is changing the Fed forever".

While the specific individual tools have varied between each generation of "put", collectively they are often referred to as the Fed put (cf. Central bank put). In late 2014, concern grew about the emergence of a so-called everything bubble due to overuse of the Fed put and perceived simultaneous pricing bubbles in most major US asset classes. By late 2020, under Powell's chairmanship, the perceived everything bubble had reached an extreme level due to unprecedented monetary looseness by the Fed, which simultaneously sent most major US asset classes (i.e. equities, bonds, housing, and commodities) to prior peaks of historical extreme valuation (and beyond in several cases), and created a highly speculative market. By early 2022, in the face of rising inflation, Powell was forced to "prick the everything bubble", and his reversal of the Fed put was termed the Fed call (i.e. a call option being the opposite of a put option).

== Overview ==
=== Naming ===
The term "Greenspan put" is a play on the term put option, which is a financial instrument that creates a contractual obligation giving its holder the right to sell an asset at a particular price to a counterparty, regardless of the prevailing market price of the asset—thus providing, to the holder of the put, a measure of insurance against falls in the price of the asset.

While Greenspan did not offer such a contractual obligation, under his chairmanship, the Federal Reserve taught markets that when a crisis arose and stock markets fell, the Fed would engage in a series of monetary tools, mostly via Wall Street investment banks, that would cause the stock market falls to reverse. The actions were also referred to as "backstopping" markets.

=== Tools ===
The main tools used by the "Greenspan put" were:

- Purchasing of Treasury bonds in large volumes by the Fed, thus lowering the yield and giving Wall Street banks profits on their Treasury books that can be invested in other assets; and
- Lowering the federal funds rate, even to the point of making the real yield negative, which would enable Wall Street banks to borrow capital cheaply from the Fed; and
- Providing Wall Street banks with new loans (called short-term "repurchase agreements", but which could be rolled over indefinitely), to buy the distressed assets (i.e. indirect quantitative easing).

Repurchase agreements (also termed "repos") are a form of indirect quantitative easing, whereby the Fed prints the new money, but unlike direct quantitative easing, the Fed does not buy the assets for its own balance sheet, but instead lends the new money to investment banks who themselves purchase the assets. Repos allow the investment banks to make both capital gains on the assets purchased (to the extent that the banks can sell the assets to the private markets at higher prices), but also the economic carry, being the annual dividend or coupon from the asset, less the interest cost of the repo.

When the balance sheets of investment banks became very stressed during the 2008 financial crisis, due to excessive use of repos, the Fed had to bypass the banks and employ direct quantitative easing; the "Bernanke put" and the "Yellen put" used mostly direct quantitative easing, whereas the "Powell put" used both direct and indirect forms.

=== Use ===
The Fed first engaged in this activity after the 1987 stock market crash, which prompted traders to coin the term "Greenspan put". The Fed also acted to avert further market declines associated with the savings and loan crisis, the Gulf War and the Mexican crisis. However, the collapse of Long Term Capital Management in 1998, which coincided with the 1997 Asian financial crisis, led to such a dramatic expansion of the Greenspan put that it created the dot-com bubble. After the collapse of the Internet bubble, Greenspan amended the tools of the Greenspan put to focus on buying mortgage-backed securities, as a method of more directly stimulating house price inflation, until that market collapsed in the Great Recession and Greenspan retired.

=== Side effects ===
In contrast to the benefits of asset price inflation, a number of adverse side effects have been identified from the Greenspan put (and the other Fed puts), including:

- Moral hazard. The expectation of a Fed put to arrest market declines created moral hazard, and was considered a driver of the high levels of speculation that created the dot-com bubble. At the beginning of the 2008 financial crisis, Wall Street banks remained relaxed in the expectation the Greenspan put would be activated. The term "don't fight the Fed" was associated with the Greenspan put: an implied recommendation not to sell or short assets when the Fed is actively pushing asset prices higher. Economist John H. Makin called it "free insurance for aggressive risk-taking".

"You can't lose in that market," he said, adding "it's like a slot machine" that always pays out. "I've not seen this in my career."

— CNBC host Jim Cramer (November 2020), after a prolonged period of the "Powell put".

- Wall Street profits. The Greenspan put created substantial profits for Wall Street investment banks who borrowed large amounts of capital cheaply from the Fed to buy distressed assets during crises. Wall Street learned to use "repurchase agreements" to push non-distressed asset prices even higher, as the positive price action (coupled with more positive analyst notes) that resulted from their repurchase agreement funded buying and stimulated investor interest, who bought the assets off Wall Street at higher prices. Wall Street came to call Greenspan "The Maestro". In 2009, the CEO of Goldman Sachs, Lloyd Blankfein, notably described the use of the tools of the Fed put as "doing God's work".
- Wealth inequality. Various economists attribute the historic widening of wealth inequality in the United States—which bottomed in the 1980s and then rose continually to reach, by late 2020, levels not seen since the late 1920s—to the effects of the Greenspan put (and the subsequent Bernanke and Powell puts); this is disputed by the Fed.

"Yeah, absolutely. You know, I think that's one of the things that's actually really not in contention, right? Like, I don't think there's really anyone on the other side of that issue saying: "No, no, no. The Fed's policies have not driven or increased wealth and income inequality." Except for maybe Fed chair Jerome Powell, himself."

— Dion Rabouin of the Wall Street Journal on a June 2022 Frontline (PBS) documentary.

- Housing bubbles. With each successive reduction in interest rates as part of the Greenspan put, US house prices responded by moving higher, due to cheaper mortgages. Eventually, stimulating a wealth effect through higher house prices became an important component of the Greenspan put until it led to the 2008 financial crisis.
- Inflation. Academic research has linked increases in asset prices to consumer inflation. The unprecedented use by Powell of the Fed put during 2020–2021 to combat the financial effects of the coronavirus pandemic led to exceptional amounts of inflation, forcing Powell to turn the Fed put into a Fed call (i.e. using the same tools to reverse the effects of the Fed put). In his 2022 book The Price of Time: The Real Story of Interest, historian Edward Chancellor showed that overuse of central banking tools such as the Fed put had led to an "everything bubble" with an inflation "hangover".
- Escalating economic crises. Steven Pearlstein of The Washington Post described it as: "In essence, the Fed has adopted a strategy that works like a one-way ratchet, providing a floor for stock and bond prices but never a ceiling. The result in part has been a series of financial crises, each requiring a bigger bailout than the last. But when the storm finally passes and it's time to begin sopping up all that emergency credit, the Fed inevitably caves in to pressure from Wall Street, the White House, business leaders and unions and conjures up some rationalization for keeping the party going."
- Political interference in markets. The ability of the Greenspan put to make stock markets rise led to concerns of political interference in markets and asset pricing. By 2020, economist Mohamed A. El-Erian noted that: "Donald Trump believed and repeatedly stated publicly that the stock market validated his policies as president. The more the market rose, the greater the affirmation of his "Make America Great Again" agenda. The president's approach was music to investors' ears. They saw it as supporting, both directly and indirectly, the notion that policymakers needed asset prices to head ever higher. It reinforced the longstanding belief of a "Fed put" — shorthand for the view that the Fed will always step in to rescue the markets — to such an extent that investor conditioning changed markedly."

Well, let me just say that the number, I think, that is staggering is that we have more people unemployed and on unemployment benefits than any time in our country's history. We know that the Fed is shoring up the markets so that the stock market can do well. I don't complain about that, I want the market to do well.

— Nancy Pelosi, commenting in October 2020 on why US stock markets were reaching new highs as US unemployment rose sharply.

== Variations ==
=== Bernanke put ===
During the 2008 financial crisis, the term "Bernanke put" was invoked to refer to the series of major monetary actions of the then Chair of the Federal Reserve, Ben Bernanke. Bernanke's actions were similar to the "Greenspan put" (e.g. reduce interest rates, offer repos to banks), with the explicit addition of direct quantitative easing (that included both Treasury bonds and mortgage-backed securities) and at a scale that was unprecedented in the history of the Fed.

Bernanke attempted to scale back the level of monetary stimulus in June 2010 by bringing QE1 to a close, however, global markets collapsed again and Bernanke was forced to introduce a second program in November 2010 called QE2. He was also forced to execute a subsequent third longer-term program in September 2012 called QE3. The markets had become so over-leveraged from decades of the "Greenspan put," that they did not have the capacity to fund US government spending without asset prices collapsing (i.e. investment banks had to sell other assets to buy the new US Treasury bonds).

In 2018, Fed Chair Jerome Powell attempted to roll-back part of the "Bernanke put" for the first time and reduce the size of the Fed's balance in a process called quantitative tightening, with a plan to go from US$4.5 trillion to US$2.5–3 trillion within 4 years, however, the tightening caused global markets to collapse again and Powell was forced to abandon his plan.

=== Yellen put ===
The term "Yellen put" refers to the Fed Chair Janet Yellen, but appears less frequently because Yellen only faced one material market correction during her tenure, in Q1 2016, where she directly invoked the monetary tools. The term was also invoked to refer to instances where Yellen sought to maintain high asset prices and market confidence by communicating a desire to maintain a continual loose monetary policy (i.e. very low interest rates and continued quantitative easing). Yellen's continual implied put (or perpetual monetary looseness), saw the term Everything Bubble emerge.

During 2015, Bloomberg wrote of Fed monetary policy, "The danger isn't that we're in a unicorn bubble. The danger isn't even that we're in a tech bubble. The danger is that we're in an Everything Bubble – that valuations across the board are simply too high." The New York Times wrote that a global "everything boom" had led to a global "everything bubble", which was driven by: "the world's major central banks have been on a six-year campaign of holding down interest rates and creating more money from thin air to try to stimulate stronger growth in the wake of the financial crisis." As Yellen's term as Fed chair came to an end in February 2018, financial writers noticed that several asset classes were simultaneously approaching levels of valuations not seen outside of financial bubbles.

=== Powell put ===
When Jerome Powell was appointed fed chair in 2018, his initial decision to unwind the Yellen put by raising interest rates and commencing quantitative tightening led to concerns that there might not be a "Powell put". Powell had to abandon this unwind when markets collapsed in Q4 2018 and his reversal was seen as a first sign of the Powell Put. As markets waned in mid-2019, Powell recreated the Greenspan Put by providing large-scale "repurchase agreements" to Wall Street investment banks as a way to boost falling asset prices and a fear that the Everything Bubble was about to deflate; this was seen as confirmation that a "Powell Put" would be invoked to artificially sustain high asset prices. By the end of 2019, US stock valuations reached valuations not seen since 1999 and so extreme were the valuations of many large US asset classes that Powell's Put was accused of re-creating the Everything Bubble. In 2020, to combat the financial effects of the COVID-19 pandemic and the bursting of the Everything Bubble Powell added the tools of the Bernanke put with significant amounts of direct quantitative easing to boost falling prices, further underlying the Powell put.

So significant was the Powell put that in June 2020, The Washington Post reported that "The Fed is addicted to propping up the markets, even without a need", and elaborated thus:

Testifying before the Senate Banking Committee, Fed Chair Jerome H. Powell was pressed by Sen. Patrick J. Toomey (R-Pa.) who asked why the Fed was continuing to intervene in credit markets that are working just fine. "If market functioning continues to improve, then we're happy to slow or even stop the purchases," Powell replied, never mentioning the possibility of selling off the bonds already bought. What Powell knows better than anyone is that the moment the Fed makes any such announcement, it will trigger a sharp sell-off by investors who have become addicted to monetary stimulus. And at this point, with so much other economic uncertainty, the Fed seems to feel it needs the support of markets as much as the markets need the Fed.

— Steven Pearlstein, The Washington Post (June 2020)

In August 2020, Bloomberg called Powell's policy response to the COVID-19 pandemic "exuberantly asymmetric" (echoing Alan Greenspan's "irrational exuberance" quote from 1996) and profiled research showing that the Fed's balance sheet was now strongly correlated to being used to rescue falling share prices or boosting flagging share prices, but that it was rarely used to control extreme stock price valuations (as the US market was then experiencing in August 2020). In November 2020, Bloomberg noted the "Powell put" was now more extreme than the Greenspan put or Bernanke put. Time noted that the scale of Powell's monetary intervention in 2020 and the tolerance of multiple asset bubbles as a side-effect of such intervention "is changing the Fed forever".

In January 2021, the former Deputy Governor of the Bank of England Sir Paul Tucker called Powell's actions a "supercharged version of the Fed put" and noted that it was being applied to all assets simultaneously: "It's no longer a Greenspan Put or a Bernanke Put or a Yellen Put. It's now the Fed Put and it's everything."

==== Everything Bubble in 2020–21 ====
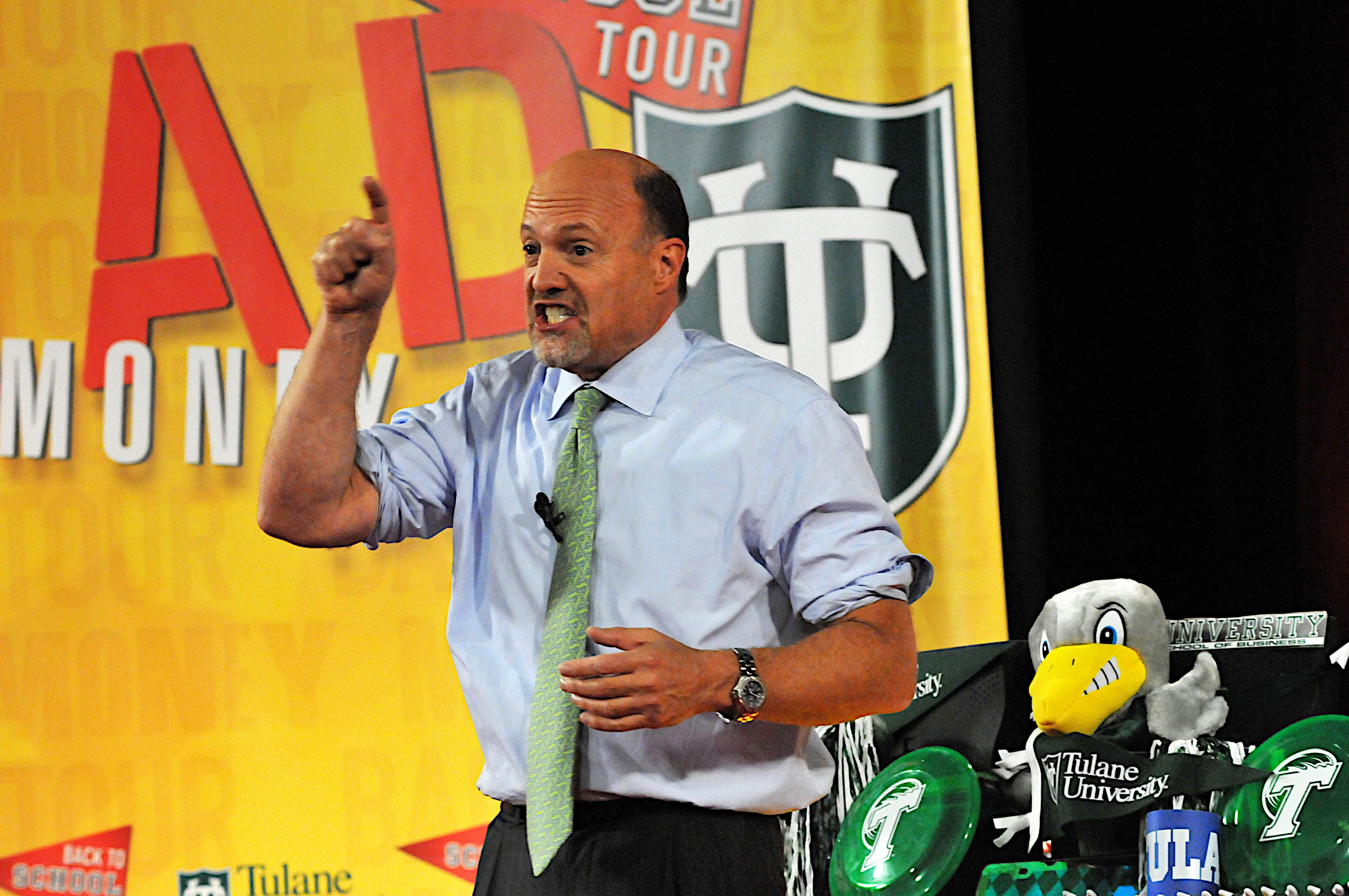
In November 2020, CNBC host Jim Cramer said the market created by the Fed in late 2020 was "the most speculative" he had ever seen.

By December 2020, Powell's monetary policy, measured by the Goldman Sachs US Financial Conditions Index (GSFCI), was the loosest in the history of the GSFCI and had created simultaneous asset bubbles across most of the major asset classes in the United States: For example, in equities, in housing and in bonds. Niche assets such as cryptocurrencies saw dramatic increases in price during 2020 and Powell won the 2020 Forbes Person of the Year in Crypto.

In December 2020, Fed Chair Jerome Powell invoked the "Fed model" to justify high market valuations, saying: "If you look at P/Es they're historically high, but in a world where the risk-free rate is going to be low for a sustained period, the equity premium, which is really the reward you get for taking equity risk, would be what you'd look at." The creator of the Fed model, Dr. Yardeni, said the Fed's financial actions during the pandemic could form the greatest financial bubble in history.

In December 2020, Bloomberg noted "Animal spirits are famously running wild across Wall Street, but crunch the numbers and this bull market is even crazier than it seems." CNBC host Jim Cramer said market created by the Fed in late 2020 was "the most speculative" he had ever seen. On 29 December 2020, the Australian Financial Review wrote that "The 'everything bubble' is back in business." On 7 January 2021, former IMF deputy director Desmond Lachman wrote that the Fed's loose monetary policy had created an "everything market bubble" in markets that matched that of 1929.

On 24 January 2021, Bloomberg reported that "Pandemic-Era Central Banking Is Creating Bubbles Everywhere" and called it the "Everything Rally," noting that other major central bankers including Haruhiko Kuroda at the BOJ, had followed Powell's strategy. In contrast, the Bank of China started withdrawing liquidity in the first quarter of 2021.

High up on his list and sooner rather than later, will be dealing with the consequences of the biggest financial bubble in U.S. history. Why the biggest? Because it encompasses not just stocks but pretty much every other financial asset too. And for that, you may thank the Federal Reserve.

— Richard Cookson, Bloomberg (4 February 2021)

==== Fed call in 2022 ====
By early 2022, rising inflation forced Powell, and latterly other central banks, to significantly tighten financial conditions including raising interest rates and quantitative tightening (the opposite of quantitative easing), which led to a synchronized fall across most asset prices (i.e. the opposite effect of the Everything Bubble). The Economist noted that the "Fed put" had now become a "Fed call" (i.e. a call option being the opposite to a put option). By June 2022, the Wall Street Journal wrote that the Fed had "pricked the Everything Bubble" by "turning the Fed put into a Fed call".

By June 2022, the US equity market registered a 20 percent fall from its 2021 high, a situation that historically had led to the "Fed put" being invoked to reverse the correction, however, the Fed instead chose to tighten markets even further by raising rates and increasing quantitative tightening. Financial journalist Philip Coggan likened the market's faith in the "Greenspan put" to the Tinkerbell phenomenon of J. M. Barrie's play, Peter Pan, saying "Investors used to believe central banks would rescue them — now they worry the banks might bury them". MoneyWeek declared "The Greenspan put is dead".

In July 2022, the former governor of the Reserve Bank of New Zealand, Graeme Wheeler, co-wrote a paper attributing the post-COVID surge in inflation to the overuse of central banking tools and the Fed put toolset in particular. A few days after the publication of Wheeler's paper, an independent investigation was launched into the role of the Reserve Bank of Australia in the post-COVID inflation surge experienced in Australia. Financial historian Edward Chancellor said "central banks' unsustainable policies have created an "everything bubble", leaving the global economy with an inflation "hangover".

==== Fed call in 2024 ====
In mid-2024 easing inflation and weakening job markets were setting expectations for the Fed to cut rates in its September meeting. Thereafter, in September 2024, the Fed cut rates by 50 basis points (one half of 1 percent), which Powell referred to as a "recalibration" in emphasis on labor market strength compared to lowering inflation. However, some critics, including then-former President Donald Trump, viewed as a politically-motivated decision, despite the Fed's longstanding policy of maintaining independence. The drop is the first of a series of expected cuts that could mirror Greenspan's cuts in 1995 and 1996, which brought the central rate to Greenspan's preferred "neutral rate".

== See also ==
- Austrian Business Cycle Theory
- Credit cycle
- Criticism of the Federal Reserve
- Easy money policy
- Liquidity trap
- Privatizing profits and socializing losses
- Speculative bubble
- Too big to fail
- Zero interest-rate policy (ZIRP)
