= Hayek Lecture =

Lecture series at the Institute of Economic Affairs

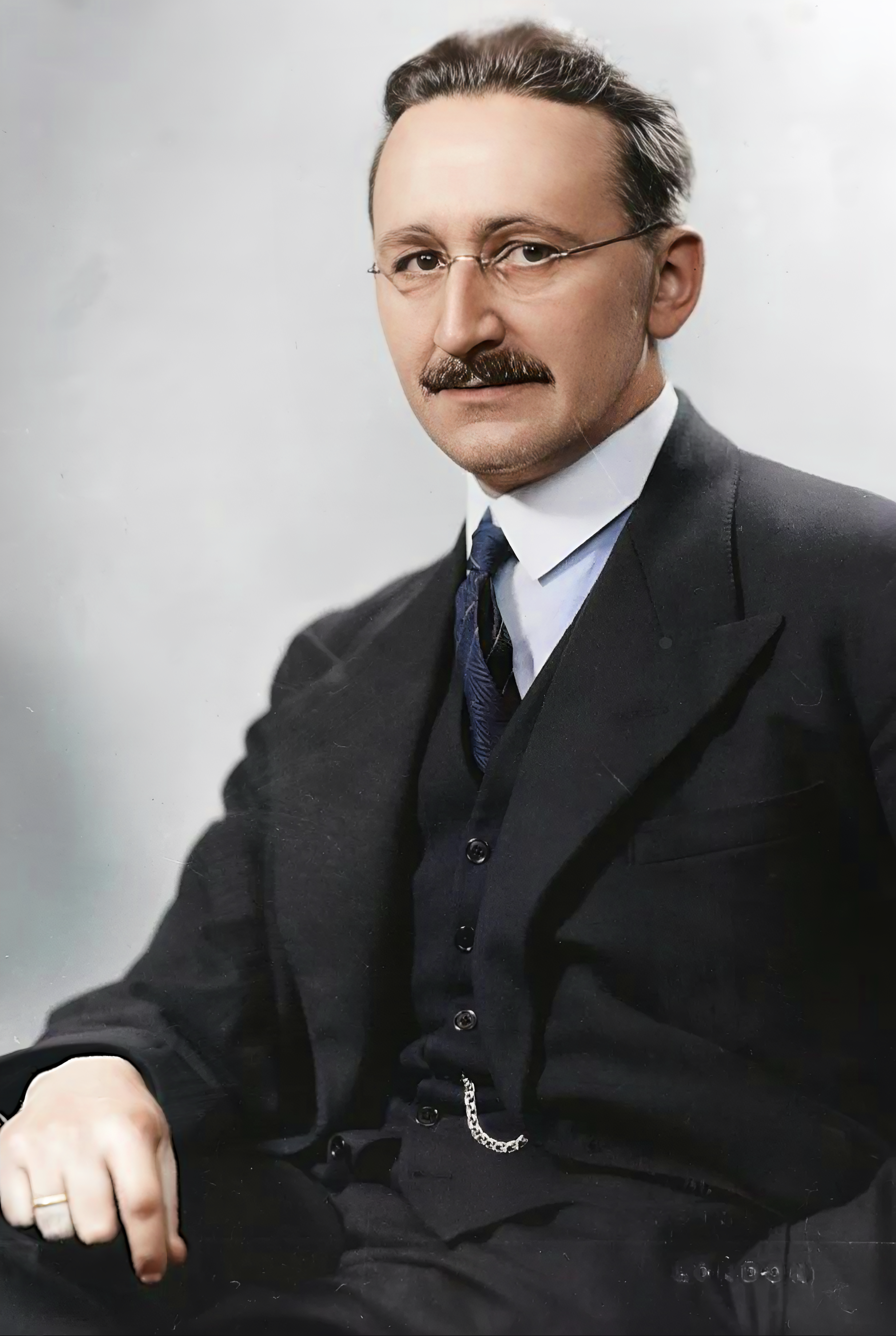
Friedrich August Hayek

The Hayek Lecture is hosted annually by the Institute of Economic Affairs in memory of Nobel Prize-winning economist Friedrich Hayek.

The first Annual Hayek Memorial Lecture was delivered by Jeffrey Sachs of Harvard University in June 1992. The lecture has been delivered by speakers ranging from academics to religious leaders, from politicians to historians. Subjects have included immigration, private education in the developing world, the economic relationship between China and Europe, and the future of capitalism.

== Speakers ==
- 1992 – Jeffrey Sachs, director, Earth Institute, Columbia University
- 1993 – Michael Novak, director of social and political studies, American Enterprise Institute
- 1994 – Peter Sutherland, businessman and former attorney general of Ireland
- 1995 – The Rt Hon Francis Maude MP, minister for the Cabinet Office and Paymaster General
- 1996 – Dr Donald Brash, former governor, Reserve Bank of New Zealand
- 1997 – Dr Vaclav Klaus, president, Czech Republic
- 1998 – Baron Jonathan Sacks, chief rabbi of the United Hebrew Congregations of the Commonwealth
- 1999 – Professor Otmar Issing, former member of the executive board of the European Central Bank
- 2000 – Dr Benno Schmidt, Edison Schools
- 2001 – Charles Calomiris, Henry Kaufman Professor of Financial Institutions, Columbia Business School
- 2002 – Hernando de Soto, president, of the Institute for Liberty and Democracy
- 2003 – Bill Emmott, former editor-in-chief, The Economist
- 2004 – Martin Wolf, associate editor and chief economics commentator at the Financial Times
- 2005 – Andrew Neil, journalist and broadcaster
- 2006 – The Hon Gale Norton, US Interior Secretary 2001-2006
- 2007 – Terence Kealey, professor of clinical biochemistry, University of Buckingham
- 2008 – Paul Johnson, writer and historian
- 2009 – James Tooley, professor of education policy at Newcastle University
- 2010 – Professor Gary Becker, economist and Nobel laureate
- 2011 – Robert Barro of Harvard University. Considered one of the founders of new classical macroeconomic, Barro is the current Paul M. Warburg Professor of Economics at Harvard
- 2012 – Elinor Ostrom, professor of political science, Indiana University, 2009 Nobel Memorial Prize in Economics laureate
- 2013 – Grover Norquist, president of Americans for Tax Reform (ATR), co-founder of the Islamic Free Market Institute
- 2014 – John B. Taylor, Mary and Robert Raymond Professor of Economics at Stanford University and the George P. Shultz Senior Fellow in Economics at the Hoover Institution.
- 2015 – William Easterly, professor of economics, New York University.
- 2016 – George Selgin, professor emeritus of economics, University of Georgia
- 2017 – Steven Landsburg, professor of economics, University of Rochester
- 2018 – Matt Ridley, author, journalist and businessman
- 2019 – Bryan Caplan, professor of economics, George Mason University
- 2020 – Stephen Davies, economic historian, author
- 2021 – Thomas Sowell, economist
- 2022 – Joseph Henrich, professor of evolutionary biology, Harvard University
- 2023 – Edward Chancellor, financial historian
