= Philip Coggan =

Philip Coggan is a British business journalist, news correspondent, and author who has written for The Economist since 2006. At the paper he authored the weekly Bartleby column on work and management until August 2021. He served as the writer of the Buttonwood column on finance before John O'Sullivan took over in 2018. Prior to joining The Economist, Coggan worked for the Financial Times for 20 years, from 1986 to 2006.

He was educated at Sidney Sussex College, Cambridge. In 2008, Coggan was named "Senior Financial Journalist of the Year" by the Wincott Foundation and in 2009 he was voted Best "Communicator" at the Business Journalist of the Year Awards. The CFA Society of the United Kingdom named him "Journalist of the Year" in 2016.

== Books ==
- Coggan, Philip (1986, 2009). The Money Machine: How the City Works. London: Penguin Books. ISBN 0141009306
- Coggan, Philip (2000). Easy Money: How to Avoid the Pitfalls of Losing Everything and Making Nothing. London: Profile Books Ltd. ISBN 1861972938
- Coggan, Philip (2005). The Economist Guide to Hedge Funds. London: Profile Books Ltd. ISBN 1846683823
- Coggan, Philip (2011). Paper Promises: Money, Debt and the New World Order]'. London: PublicAffairs. ISBN 1610391268
- Coggan, Philip (2013). The Last Vote: the Threats to Western Democracy. London: Allen Lane. ISBN 1846146895
- Coggan, Philip (2020). More: A History of the World Economy from the Iron Age to the Information Age. London: The Economist. ISBN 1610399838

== See also ==
- Greenspan put, subject on which Coggan has written in the FT
- List of British journalists
