= Megan Marshall =

American scholar, writer, and biographer (born 1954)

Megan Marshall (born June 8, 1954) is an American scholar, writer, and biographer.

Her first biography The Peabody Sisters: Three Women Who Ignited American Romanticism (2005) earned her a place as a finalist for the 2006 Pulitzer Prize for Biography or Autobiography.

Her second biography Margaret Fuller: A New American Life (2013) is an account of Margaret Fuller, the 19th-century author, journalist, and women's rights advocate who died in a shipwreck off New York's Fire Island. It won the 2014 Pulitzer Prize for Biography or Autobiography.

== Biography ==
Marshall was born in Oakland, California. Her mother was a book designer; her father worked in city government. Marshall came East to attend Bennington College as a literature and music major, but she left college without finishing and later enrolled at Harvard College, where she studied with poets Robert Lowell, Elizabeth Bishop, Robert Fitzgerald, and Jane Shore. She earned a BA degree in 1977 and was elected to Phi Beta Kappa.

Before turning to writing, Marshall worked in the publishing industry and taught. From 1980 to 2007, she was married to author John Sedgwick.

Her first book, published in 1984, was The Cost of Loving: Women and the New Fear of Intimacy, which examines the impact of the feminist movement on its followers.

Marshall is particularly interested in uncovering and exploring the lives of women who have been forgotten by traditional historians and biographers.

Supported by grants and teaching, she worked on the book The Peabody Sisters for nearly 20 years, reading original letters and documents as well as delving into the newspapers and literature of the era. The book focused on the lives of Elizabeth Palmer Peabody, Mary Tyler Peabody Mann, and Sophia Hawthorne. Her second biography is Margaret Fuller: A New American Life.

In a conversation in Radcliffe Magazine with author Margot Livesey, Marshall spoke about the connection between the two biographies: "I wrote The Peabody Sisters partly to prove that the New England Transcendentalists included other brilliant women besides Fuller. Then I discovered that during the 20 years I’d spent researching the Peabodys, Fuller had been largely forgotten. No one recognized her name anymore. This was a shock to me, and a loss I wanted to repair."

In addition to her books, Marshall writes occasionally for The New Yorker, Slate, The New York Times Book Review, The London Review of Books, and other publications. She was a fellow at the Radcliffe Institute for Advanced Study at Harvard University in 2006–07, and writes book reviews for Radcliffe Magazine.

Since 2007 she has been assistant professor in writing, Literature & Publishing at Emerson College.

Marshall lives in Belmont, Massachusetts.

== Books ==
- The Cost of Loving: Women and the New Fear of Intimacy, 1984.
- The Peabody Sisters: Three Women Who Ignited American Romanticism, 2005.
- Margaret Fuller: A New American Life, 2013.
- Elizabeth Bishop: A Miracle for Breakfast, 2017.

== Honors ==
Marshall, who was named the most promising writer in her Harvard class of 1977 by Harvard Monthly, is the recipient of awards from the Guggenheim Foundation, the National Endowment for the Humanities and the Radcliffe Institute.

Aside from being a Pulitzer finalist, The Peabody Sisters was awarded the Francis Parkman Prize, the Mark Lynton History Prize, and the Massachusetts Book Award in nonfiction.

Her biography of Margaret Fuller won the 2014 Pulitzer Prize for Biography.
