= John Sedgwick (author) =

American author (1954–2026)

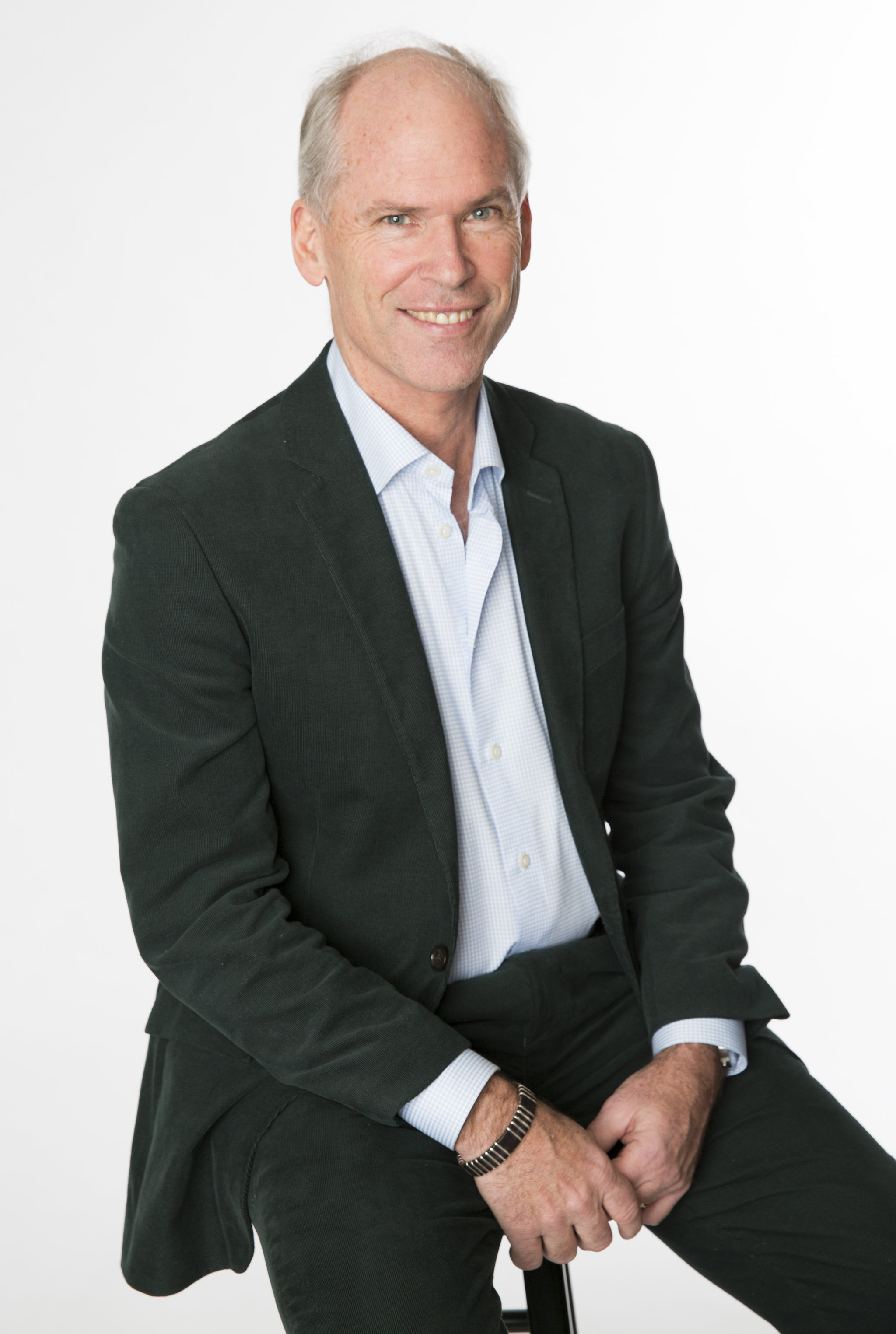
- Sedgwick in 2017
- Born: May 15, 1954; Boston, Massachusetts, U.S.
- Died: August 30, 2026 (aged 72); New York City, U.S.
- Education: Groton School; Harvard University (AB)
- Occupation: Author
- Website: johnsedgwick.biz

John Shaw Sedgwick (May 5, 1954 – August 30, 2026) was an American author. He wrote or co-wrote 15 books and published numerous magazine articles. His book subjects included the Philadelphia Zoo, his family history, Alexander Hamilton's duel with Aaron Burr, railroad companies competing to link up with the western United States, wealthy children, and the Cherokee Nation. He also wrote novels.

== Early life and education ==
Sedgwick was born in Boston on May 5, 1954, the youngest child of Boston investment advisor R. Minturn Sedgwick, and his wife, Emily Ames Sedgwick (née Lincoln). He grew up in the Boston suburb of Dedham, Massachusetts, and earned his high school diploma from Groton School. In 1977, Sedgwick graduated Harvard University with an A.B. in English. While at Harvard, Sedgwick wrote for The Harvard Crimson.

John Sedgwick was a member of the prominent Sedgwick family. His forebears arrived in America in 1635 or 1636, and included House Speaker Theodore Sedgwick, novelist Catharine Maria Sedgwick, and sixties cultural icon Edie Sedgwick, among others.

== Career ==
Sedgwick began his writing career as a senior at Harvard University, when he published two articles: one in Harvard Magazine about Minoan archaeology, and another in Esquire co-written with Anne Fadiman about graffiti in Harvard bathroom stalls. Sedgwick served as an editor at Newsweek and at Self Care, and frequently published essays and stories in numerous magazines, including The Atlantic, Vanity Fair, Rolling Stone, Esquire, GQ, and many others. Sedgwick's From the River to the Sea: The Untold Story of the Railroad War That Made the West tells the story of competition between the Rio Grande and Santa Fe railroads as they charted paths across largely undeveloped lands of the Old American West.

Sedgwick is best known for his family memoir, In My Blood: Six Generations of Madness and Desire in an American Family and his co-biography, War of Two: Alexander Hamilton, Aaron Burr and the Duel that Stunned the Nation, which won the History Prize of the New Jersey Society of the Cincinnati and was a finalist for the George Washington Prize. Sedgwick is also known for his biography of two rival Cherokee Chiefs, Blood Moon: An American Epic of War and Splendor in the Cherokee Nation.

== Personal life ==
Sedgwick first married writer Megan Marshall and fathered two children with her. Their marriage ended in 2007. In 2013 he married journalist Rana Foroohar. He died on August 30, 2026 in Brooklyn, New York, at the age of 72.

== Books ==
- Night Vision: Confessions of Gil Lewis, Private Eye (1982)
- Rich Kids: America’s Young Heirs and Heiresses, How They Love and Hate Their Money (1985)
- The Peaceable Kingdom: A Year in the Life of America's Oldest Zoo (1988)
- The Dark House (2001)
- The Education of Mrs. Bemis (2003)
- In My Blood: Six Generations of Madness and Desire in an American Family (2008)
- War of Two: Alexander Hamilton, Aaron Burr, And the Duel That Stunned the Nation (2016)
- Blood Moon: An American Epic of War and Splendor in the Cherokee Nation (2019)
- From the River to the Sea: The Untold Story of the Railroad War That Made the West (2021)
