= Martin Vander Weyer =

British journalist

Martin Vander Weyer is a British financial journalist, business editor of The Spectator, and a member of the British-American Project.

A Yorkshireman (he lives in Thirsk and Malton) of Flemish ancestry, he is the son of Deryk Vander Weyer, who was a London banker with Barclays, where he rose to deputy chairman and later was deputy chairman of BT.

Vander Weyer spent 15 years in investment banking, working for Schroders and Barclays in London, Brussels and the Far East.

As a journalist, Vander Weyer writes about business, economics and financial morality. He is the business editor and “Any Other Business” columnist of The Spectator as well as editor of the monthly Spectator Business. He is a regular contributor to the Daily Telegraph, Sunday Telegraph, Daily Mail and other national publications. He was previously city editor of The Week.

He is the author of Falling Eagle: the Decline of Barclays Bank (2000), and Closing Balances: Business Obituaries from the Daily Telegraph (2006).

In August 2015, it was announced that Vander Weyer will take up the role of patron to the York Union at the University of York.

== Bibliography ==
=== Books ===
- Vander Weyer, Martin (2000). Falling Eagle: the Decline of Barclays Bank. London: Phoenix.
- Vander Weyer, Martin (2021). The Good, The Bad And The Greedy: Why We've Lost Faith In Capitalism. London: Biteback Publishing.

=== Articles ===
- Vander Weyer, Martin (4 January 2014). "Making the best of an imperfect world: a vision of the future from my hospital bed". Any Other Business. The Spectator. 324 (9671): 19.
