= GMO LLC =

Asset management firm based in Boston

Grantham, Mayo, Van Otterloo & Co. LLC
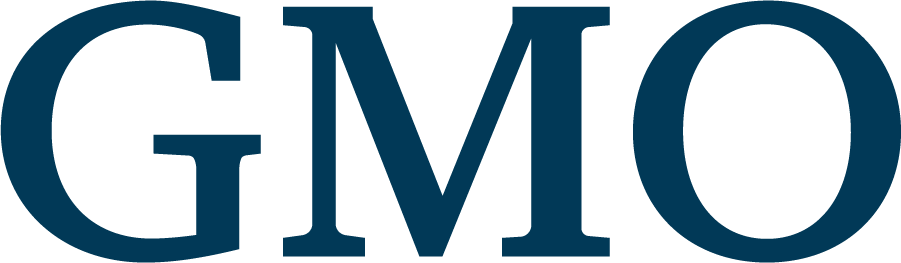
- Company type: Private
- Industry: Investment Management
- Founded: 1977; 49 years ago
- Founders: Jeremy Grantham; Dick Mayo; Eijk van Otterloo
- Headquarters: Boston, Massachusetts, U.S.
- Key people: Scott Hayward (CEO)
- AUM: US$63.39 billion (March 2024)
- Number of employees: 369 (March 2024)
- Website: www.gmo.com

GMO LLC (also known as GMO and Grantham, Mayo, Van Otterloo & Co. LLC) is an American investment management firm headquartered in Boston. The firm takes a contrarian investing and generally bearish approach to the markets and holds the views that assets will revert to the mean. As a result, the firm has successfully called economic bubbles. At its peak in 2007, the firm had $155 billion in assets under management (AUM) although it has declined since.

Outside Boston, the firm has offices in Amsterdam, London, San Francisco, Singapore, Sydney and Tokyo.

== Background ==
Jeremy Grantham, Dick Mayo and Eijk van Otterloo founded GMO in Boston in 1977. Prior to that Grantham and Mayo founded Batterymarch Financial Management in 1969 while Van Otterloo was a former colleague of Grantham. The three all were portfolio managers and GMO was launched as a conservative, value-oriented money management shop although it has expanded since. Since 1996, Van Otterloo has not had a day-to-day money management role and is considered retired while Mayo left in December 2001 to run a hedge fund, Game Creek Capital with his son.

Grantham drove investment strategy using his quantitative background to create both equity and bond funds that run on models to make bets when asset prices deviate from historical means. Using this method, the firm would be able to track decades-long economic bubbles. Bubbles the firm correctly called and profited from include the Japanese asset price bubble, the Dot-com bubble and the 2000s United States housing bubble.

GMO generally follows the investment philosophy of Graham which believes that all asset classes and markets will revert to mean historical levels from highs and lows. As a result, it takes contrary and generally bearish approaches to the markets and allocates assets based on internal predictions of market direction. The firm has a successful track record of calling economic bubbles but its approach of having a long-term investment horizon, strict adherence to its investment strategy and lack of marketing has made it unpopular among some of its clients. Due to the underperformance of its funds in the shorter term horizon due to the bullish performance of the markets, some of its U.S. pension fund clients have either put GMO on their watchlist or terminated their investment mandates entirely in favour of going to growth investing firms that offered a more optimistic outlook. The AUM of GMO has fluctuated throughout the years with it gaining new investment mandates after economic bubbles burst and losing them during bull markets. The firm has not reached its AUM peak of $155 billion since and has seen its AUM decline over the years.

However, GMO also has some funds that follow different strategies. In 1994, GMO acquired a fund established by Bill Nemerever and Thomas Cooper that focused on buying defaulted bank loans and Brady Bonds. It would become the GMO Emerging Country Debt Fund that profited from investing in emerging market country debt. In addition, GMO has held a bullish view on emerging market equities.

In 2016, GMO cut 10% of its 650 staff workforce which included staff such as its CEO.

In July 2020, GMO acquired Usonian Investments, a Japan-based equity manager.

Due to the 2022 stock market decline, GMO's Equity Dislocation strategy which was launched in October 2020, returned 13.7%.

In January 2023, GMO put out a statement that it believes the next leg of resurgence will come from deep value stocks which are the cheapest ones based on their valuation multiples.
