= Rana Foroohar =

American journalist (born 1970)

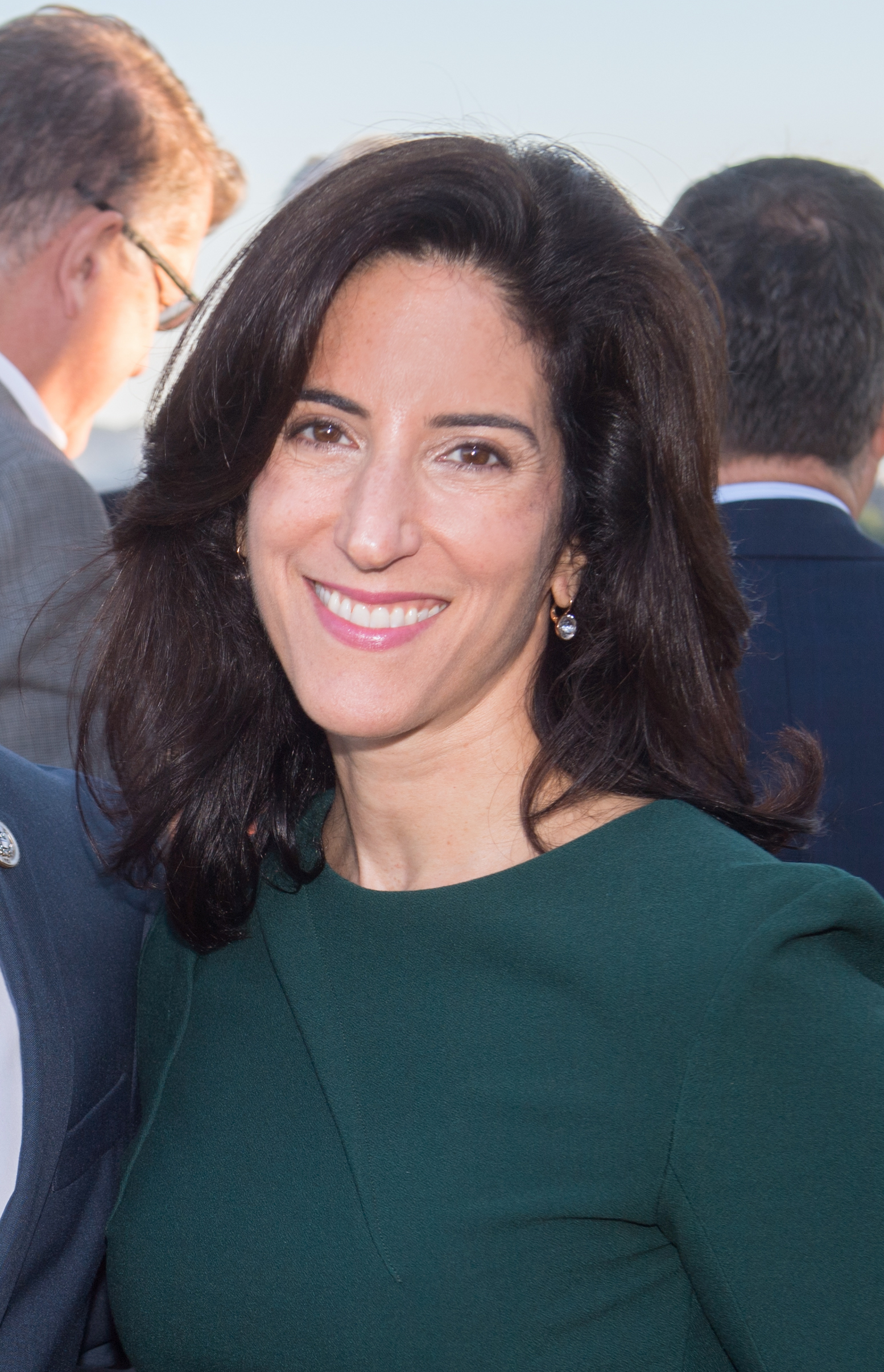
- Foroohar in 2017
- Born: Rana Aylin Dogar; March 4, 1970 (age 56); Frankfort, Indiana, U.S.
- Education: Barnard College (BA)
- Children: 2
- Website: ranaforoohar.com

Rana Aylin Foroohar (née Dogar; born March 4, 1970) is an American author, business columnist and an associate editor at the Financial Times. She is also CNN's global economic analyst.

== Life and career ==
Foroohar was born Rana Aylin Dogar in Frankfort, Indiana, graduating from Frankfort Senior High School in 1988. Her father, Aygen Erol Dogar, is a Turkish immigrant and engineer who started a small manufacturing business in the Midwest. Her mother Ann was a school teacher, and herself the daughter of immigrants from Sweden and England. In 1992, Foroohar graduated from Barnard College with a B.A. in English literature.

Foroohar spent thirteen years at Newsweek, as an economics and foreign affairs editor and as a London-based correspondent covering Europe and the Middle East. During that time, she was awarded the German Marshall Fund's Peter Weitz Prize for transatlantic reporting. She has also received awards and fellowships from institutions such as the Paul H. Nitze School of Advanced International Studies at Johns Hopkins University and the East–West Center.

Foroohar then spent six years at Time magazine, as an assistant editor and economic columnist. Her articles included a 2013 cover story entitled "The Myth of Financial Reform", which was criticized by the U.S. Department of the Treasury.

In 2016, she published her first book, Makers and Takers: The Rise of Finance and the Fall of American Business. The book was shortlisted for the 2016 Financial Times and McKinsey Business Book of the Year Award.

She joined the Financial Times as a columnist and associate editor in March 2017.

In November 2019, Foroohar published her second book Don't Be Evil: How Big Tech Betrayed Its Founding Principles—and All of Us. Her third book, Homecoming: The Path to Prosperity in a Post-Global World, was published in October 2022.

Her work has appeared in The New York Review of Books. She has also been interviewed on National Public Radio.

== Personal life ==
Foroohar lives in Brooklyn with her two children. From 2013 until his death in 2026, she was the second wife of the writer John Sedgwick.

== Books ==
- Foroohar, Rana (2016). Makers and Takers: The Rise of Finance and the Fall of American Business. Crown Publishing Group. ISBN 978-0-553-44723-1.
- Foroohar, Rana (2019). Don't Be Evil: How Big Tech Betrayed Its Founding Principles—and All of Us. Currency. ISBN 978-1-984-82398-4.
- Foroohar, Rana (2022). Homecoming: The Path to Prosperity in a Post-Global World. Crown Publishing Group. ISBN 978-0-593-24054-0.

== See also ==
- Everything bubble, Foroohar predicted its bursting in 2022
