= John D. Johnson (politician) =

American academic and politician

John Johnson

Academic background
- Education: Weber State University (BA); Texas A&M University (PhD)

Academic work
- Discipline: Economics; Business
- Sub-discipline: Management information systems
- Institutions: Southern Methodist University; University of Mississippi; Utah State University

Member of the Utah Senate
- Incumbent
- Assumed office January 1, 2021
- Preceded by: Allen M. Christensen
- Constituency: 19th District (2021–2023); 3rd District (2023–present)

Personal details
- Party: Republican

John D. Johnson is an American academic and politician who is a member of the Utah State Senate from the 3rd district. Elected in November 2020, he assumed office on January 1, 2021. He represented the 19th district between 2021 and 2023 prior to redistricting.

== Early life and education ==
A native of Weber County, Utah, Johnson graduated from Weber High School in 1977. He earned a Bachelor of Arts degree in economics from Weber State University and a PhD in economics from Texas A&M University.

== Career ==
In 1986 and 1987, Johnson was a visiting professor of economics at Southern Methodist University. From 1987 to 2000, he was an associate professor at the University of Mississippi. Johnson became a professor and chair of the management and information systems department at the Jon M. Huntsman School of Business in 2006.

Johnson has founded several companies, including FNC_Inc. and Politicit, which is a political podcast.

Johnson was elected to the Utah Senate in November 2020, defeating Democratic nominee Katy Owens. During the campaign, Johnson characterized himself as a "Reagan Republican".

== Electoral history ==
2024 Utah State Senate election, District 19
Party	Candidate	Votes	%
Republican	John D. Johnson	28,213	57.5
Democratic	Stacy Bernal	20,824	42.5

2020 Utah State Senate election, District 19
Party	Candidate	Votes	%
Republican	John D. Johnson	27,728	57.1
Democratic	Katy Owens	20,859	42.9
