= Longfield (surname) =

Longfield is an English surname. Notable people with the surname include:

- Anne Longfield, Baroness Longfield (born 1960), former Children's Commissioner for England
- Chuck Longfield (born 1956), American philanthropist and non-profit sector expert
- Cynthia Longfield (1896–1991), Irish entomologist and explorer
- Geoffrey Longfield (1909–1943), English cricketer and Royal Air Force officer
- John Longfield (1805–1889), Irish officer in the British Army
- Judi Longfield (born 1947), Canadian politician
- Lloyd Longfield (born 1956), Canadian politician
- Mountifort Longfield (1802–1884), Irish lawyer and economist
- Richard Longfield (1802–1889), Irish politician
- Richard Longfield, 1st Viscount Longueville (1734–1811), Irish politician
- Robert Longfield, American composer
- Sarah Longfield (born 1994), American musician and YouTuber
- Tom Longfield (1906–1981), English cricketer
- Zoe Longfield (1924–2013), American artist
