= Chuck Longfield =

- Born: Charles Louis Longfield; October 25, 1956 (age 70); Boston, Massachusetts, United States
- Education: Harvard College
- Occupations: Senior Vice President and Chief Scientist at Blackbaud, Speaker, Philanthropist
- Website: LongfieldFoundation.org

Charles Louis Longfield (born 1956) is an American nonprofit sector expert, speaker, and philanthropist.

== Background ==
Longfield was born on October 25, 1956, in Boston, Massachusetts. Longfield graduated from Boston Latin School in 1974 and went on to attend Harvard College, where he graduated with a Bachelor of Arts degree in applied mathematics in 1978. He would later earn a Master's of Education degree in mathematics from Harvard University Graduate School of Education in 1989.

== Career ==
In 1978, Longfield began work at Access International. He was the principal architect of the Access Fundraising system and was responsible for its successful installation at dozens of not-for-profit organizations. Longfield would eventually serve as Chief Operating Officer at Access International before leaving the company in 1987.

Between 1987 and 1991, Longfield took a sabbatical, earned a graduate degree from Harvard University, and began teaching mathematics to middle and high school students.

In 1991, Longfield founded Target Analysis Group in Cambridge, Massachusetts where one of his first projects was to help Public Broadcasting Stations evaluate and select a new advanced membership software for stations.

Target Analysis Group delivered data mining, predictive modeling, and unique collaborative benchmarking services to hundreds of nonprofits of all sizes. Clients include American Civil Liberties Union, American Heart Association, Doctors Without Borders, Easter Seals and Oxfam America.

In November 1991, Longfield would join with Karl Case, Robert J. Shiller, and Allan Weiss as a partner with Case Shiller Weiss, Inc, a firm whose sole purpose then was to produce home price indices designed expressly to settle financial contracts. Their work would later come to be known as the Case–Shiller index Shlller, the 2013 winner of the Nobel Memorial Prize in Economic Sciences once noted in an interview that "we brought in a fourth, a real businessman, but (Longfield) said it would be ridiculous to have four names on the company."

Longfield would go on to also found Target Software in 1993 to complement the data aspects of Target Analysis Group. Target Software clients included high-volume direct response marketers including American Diabetes Association, Children's Cancer Research Fund, Greenpeace USA, Massachusetts Audubon Society, Special Olympics, and World Wildlife Fund.

In January 2007, Blackbaud acquired both Target Analysis Group and Target Software for an aggregate purchase price of approximately $60 million. Following the acquisition, Longfield became Blackbaud's chief scientist where he continues a variety of research initiatives.

== Honors and awards ==
- 2007: FundRaising Success Magazine Lifetime Achievement Award for Contribution to the Nonprofit Sector

== Patents ==
- 2016: "Systems, methods, and computer program products for data integration and data mapping", U.S. Patent #9,443,033
