= Home equity protection =

Financial product to hedge property value

Home price protection is an agreement that pays the homeowner if a particular home price index declines in value over a period of time after the protection is purchased. The protection is for a new or existing homeowner that wishes to protect the value of their home from future market declines.

== Scholarly research ==
In 1999, Robert J. Shiller and Allan Weiss published an overview of the idea. Two similar programs had been tried in Illinois by municipalities: a 1978 Oak Park plan, which had never had a claim as of 1999, and a broader program covering the city of Chicago passed by voter referendum in 1987 and implemented in 1990.

Another program was initiated 2002 as several scholars at Yale University worked in conjunction with a program in Syracuse, NY, which was developed with the intent of increasing home ownership in neighborhoods on the verge of collapse that were marred by ever declining home prices. The Syracuse non-profit program, called Home Headquarters, was sponsored by the Syracuse Neighborhood Initiative, and a homeowner could protect the value of their home for a one-time fee of 1.5% of the home's value. In many cases, a local organization would pay the fee for the homeowner if they agreed to live in the home for 3 years. Similar programs were developed in other municipalities to encourage home ownership in specific areas that were considered to be at risk of losing home value due to increased rental conversions and other factors.

== Hedging ==
Any protection contract is essentially providing a hedge to the owner against declining home prices. The provider (protection seller) of the contract will generally have a significant reserve in place and will also hedge their risk using housing futures from the CBOE Chicago Board Options Exchange & CME Chicago Board of Trade and other real estate short strategies to help mitigate losses. Some providers utilize reinsurance from A rated carriers to provide more durable secondary risk protection.

== Payouts ==
Losses are generally measured by a nationally recognized house price index such as Office of Federal Housing Enterprise Oversight (OFHEO), Radar Logic, First American Core Logic, or the S&P Case-Shiller index.

== Differences from insurance ==
Most home equity protection products are not insurance and do not require an insurable interest from the buyer of protection, however some providers offer an insurance version of the product.

== Swaps ==
There are some similarities with swaps, particularly total return swap and credit default swaps.

== Vendors ==
Companies offering the product include EquityLock.

Alternatively, it is possible to hedge the risk of a housing price decline using Case-Shiller Futures.

Waiting periods are required in many of the programs to prevent the owner of the home price protection agreement from gaming the system.

The protection generally covers all sales to unrelated parties including short sales but will not cover foreclosures.

== See also ==
- United States housing bubble
- Chicago Board of Trade
- Real estate bubble
- Great Recession
- Real estate pricing
- Real estate appraisal
- Real estate economics
- Real estate trends
- Deed in lieu of foreclosure
- Foreclosure consultant
