= Residential Property Price Index =

South African housing price index

The Residential Property Price Index (RPPI) is a South African monthly residential housing price index published by Stats SA, with data recorded since 2010. The agency publishes indices measuring changes in residential property prices at national, provincial, and metro levels.

== Context ==
The Residential Property Price Index was developed by Statistics South Africa in partnership with the South African Reserve Bank, with technical support from the International Monetary Fund. It was first published in March 2023 as experimental statistics to obtain stakeholder feedback. Following methodological revisions, the index became an official statistical release in June 2024.

== Methodology ==
The RPPI is compiled using residential property transactions registered with the Office of the Chief Registrar of Deeds, sometimes referred to as the Deeds Office. It covers the sales of new builds and previously owned residential properties, including freestanding houses and condominium (sectional title) properties.

The index uses prices recorded in actual property transactions, rather than advertised asking prices. The RPPI measures price changes at national, provincial, and metropolitan municipality levels.

Stats SA uses a hedonic regression model to account for differences in property characteristics, including location, size, and property type. The resulting indices are smoothed using a Henderson filter to reduce short-term volatility in the housing market. Unlike average selling prices, the RPPI is designed to measure changes in property values while controlling for differences in the properties sold. The most recent 12 months of data are subject to revision as additional property transactions are registered.

The RPPI uses December 2020 as the base period (index = 100).

== RPPI chart ==
The RPPI at the national level and for SA's eight metros, for the period 2010 through Q2 2026

== Historical data ==
The following table presents the historical RPPI at the national level, and for the country's eight metropolitan municipalities. The seat of each metro is in the explanatory footnotes. Figures are for December for all except the current year, which features data as at June 2026.

Year	National	Buffalo City (Note: The administrative seat of Buffalo City is East London)	Cape Town (Note: The administrative seat of the City of Cape Town is Cape Town)	Ekurhuleni (Note: The administrative seat of Ekurhuleni is Germiston)	eThekwini (Note: The administrative seat of eThekwini is Durban)	Johannesburg (Note: The administrative seat of the City of Johannesburg is Johannesburg)	Mangaung (Note: The administrative seat of Mangaung is Bloemfontein)	Nelson Mandela Bay (Note: The administrative seat of Nelson Mandela Bay is Gqeberha)	Tshwane (Note: The administrative seat of Tshwane is Pretoria)	Ref
2010	59.7	63.5	48.4	66.3	64.6	63.4	69.6	61.3	61.8	
2011	61.4	67.7	49.9	67.2	67.4	64.1	72.4	63.4	64.0	
2012	65.2	71.4	53.3	70.6	70.2	68.8	78.6	64.5	68.0	
2013	69.5	71.2	57.5	73.4	73.3	75.2	83.9	67.7	72.5	
2014	74.6	79.9	64.3	77.0	78.5	81.0	85.9	71.4	75.9	
2015	80.4	81.7	73.2	81.3	85.1	86.8	88.9	71.9	80.9	
2016	84.1	84.2	81.0	82.2	87.1	89.4	83.8	76.4	85.6	
2017	89.4	90.8	88.6	86.6	90.7	93.1	89.9	80.8	89.6	
2018	91.9	95.2	91.4	89.6	92.5	94.7	94.1	83.4	91.6	
2019	94.1	92.6	93.4	92.3	95.4	95.1	95.1	90.7	93.0	
2020	100.0	100.0	100.0	100.0	100.0	100.0	100.0	100.0	100.0	
2021	106.1	99.6	106.3	106.3	107.4	103.6	109.0	107.6	107.2	
2022	109.8	99.0	110.6	111.2	107.8	104.2	113.1	109.1	108.3	
2023	111.6	103.5	113.7	110.5	105.9	101.8	115.8	109.9	109.2	
2024	116.0	102.5	120.5	110.3	107.9	102.8	121.0	117.1	112.0	
2025	123.5	109.8	131.5	115.3	111.5	107.0	124.9	120.2	115.5	
2026	128.5	109.6	139.8	119.6	114.4	109.4	129.0	121.6	117.6	

=== Provincial data ===
The following table presents the historical RPPI for South Africa's nine provinces. The most populous city in each province is in the explanatory footnotes. Figures are for December for all except the current year, which features data as at June 2026.

Year	Eastern Cape (Note: The most populous city in the Eastern Cape is Gqeberha)	Free State (Note: The most populous city in the Free State is Bloemfontein)	Gauteng (Note: The most populous city in Gauteng is Johannesburg)	KwaZulu-Natal (Note: The most populous city in KwaZulu-Natal is Durban)	Limpopo (Note: The most populous city in Limpopo is Polokwane)	Mpumalanga (Note: The most populous city in Mpumalanga is Mbombela)	North West (Note: The most populous city in North West is Rustenburg)	Northern Cape (Note: The most populous city in the Northern Cape is Kimberley)	Western Cape (Note: The most populous city in the Western Cape is Cape Town)	Ref
2010	61.8	68.6	63.5	63.2	81.3	76.5	86.1	56.0	49.5	
2011	64.7	71.0	64.7	66.6	91.5	80.7	85.3	59.1	50.9	
2012	66.7	77.7	68.9	70.0	98.3	84.6	90.4	61.1	54.1	
2013	68.7	82.2	74.0	73.5	95.6	90.6	93.7	69.5	58.2	
2014	74.1	85.0	78.6	79.4	95.2	87.7	94.2	75.3	65.0	
2015	75.0	88.5	83.9	85.8	97.7	94.1	91.1	81.0	73.0	
2016	78.8	83.9	86.7	86.5	94.6	90.5	94.7	81.9	80.1	
2017	83.9	89.7	90.7	91.4	98.6	86.0	95.5	96.6	87.7	
2018	87.1	93.2	92.7	92.3	100.2	90.7	97.3	100.0	90.9	
2019	91.3	94.5	93.9	95.2	95.9	95.3	97.4	101.3	93.9	
2020	100.0	100.0	100.0	100.0	100.0	100.0	100.0	100.0	100.0	
2021	104.9	110.0	105.4	105.3	105.5	101.2	108.7	100.7	107.6	
2022	105.8	111.6	107.1	106.9	107.2	113.9	114.3	105.5	114.2	
2023	107.5	113.0	106.4	105.1	109.4	118.8	121.7	100.5	119.3	
2024	112.2	119.1	107.9	107.0	119.7	121.6	127.6	90.9	127.0	
2025	116.7	123.7	112.2	110.5	134.8	134.6	130.6	92.3	139.4	
2026	117.5	129.3	114.9	112.7	135.9	136.8	142.2	83.0	147.5	

== Year-over-year changes ==
The following table presents annual percentage changes in the RPPI at the national level, and for the country's eight metropolitan municipalities. Figures are calculated by comparing December index values with those of the preceding year, except for 2026, which represents the 12-month change to June 2026.

Year	National	Buffalo City (Note: The administrative seat of Buffalo City is East London)	Cape Town (Note: The administrative seat of the City of Cape Town is Cape Town)	Ekurhuleni (Note: The administrative seat of Ekurhuleni is Germiston)	eThekwini (Note: The administrative seat of eThekwini is Durban)	Johannesburg (Note: The administrative seat of the City of Johannesburg is Johannesburg)	Mangaung (Note: The administrative seat of Mangaung is Bloemfontein)	Nelson Mandela Bay (Note: The administrative seat of Nelson Mandela Bay is Gqeberha)	Tshwane (Note: The administrative seat of Tshwane is Pretoria)	Ref
2011	▲2.8%	▲6.6%	▲3.1%	▲1.4%	▲4.3%	▲1.1%	▲4.0%	▲3.4%	▲3.6%	
2012	▲6.2%	▲5.5%	▲6.8%	▲5.1%	▲4.2%	▲7.3%	▲8.6%	▲1.7%	▲6.2%	
2013	▲6.6%	▼0.3%	▲7.9%	▲4.0%	▲4.4%	▲9.3%	▲6.7%	▲5.0%	▲6.6%	
2014	▲7.3%	▲12.2%	▲11.8%	▲4.9%	▲7.1%	▲7.7%	▲2.4%	▲5.5%	▲4.7%	
2015	▲7.8%	▲2.3%	▲13.8%	▲5.6%	▲8.4%	▲7.2%	▲3.5%	▲0.7%	▲6.6%	
2016	▲4.6%	▲3.1%	▲10.7%	▲1.1%	▲2.4%	▲3.0%	▼5.7%	▲6.3%	▲5.8%	
2017	▲6.3%	▲7.8%	▲9.4%	▲5.4%	▲4.1%	▲4.1%	▲7.3%	▲5.8%	▲4.7%	
2018	▲2.8%	▲4.8%	▲3.2%	▲3.5%	▲2.0%	▲1.7%	▲4.7%	▲3.2%	▲2.2%	
2019	▲2.4%	▼2.7%	▲2.2%	▲3.0%	▲3.1%	▲0.4%	▲1.1%	▲8.8%	▲1.5%	
2020	▲6.3%	▲8.0%	▲7.1%	▲8.3%	▲4.8%	▲5.2%	▲5.2%	▲10.3%	▲7.5%	
2021	▲6.1%	▼0.4%	▲6.3%	▲6.3%	▲7.4%	▲3.6%	▲9.0%	▲7.6%	▲7.2%	
2022	▲3.5%	▼0.6%	▲4.0%	▲4.6%	▲0.4%	▲0.6%	▲3.8%	▲1.4%	▲1.0%	
2023	▲1.6%	▲4.5%	▲2.8%	▼0.6%	▼1.8%	▼2.3%	▲2.4%	▲0.7%	▲0.8%	
2024	▲3.9%	▼1.0%	▲6.0%	▼0.2%	▲1.9%	▲1.0%	▲4.5%	▲6.6%	▲2.6%	
2025	▲6.5%	▲7.1%	▲9.1%	▲4.5%	▲3.3%	▲4.1%	▲3.2%	▲2.6%	▲3.1%	
2026	▲8.1%	▲2.3%	▲12.0%	▲7.2%	▲5.1%	▲4.9%	▲3.7%	▲3.1%	▲3.3%	

== Percentage change over entire period ==
The following table presents the percentage changes in the RPPI between 2010 and 2026 at the national level, and for the country's eight metropolitan municipalities. Figures are calculated by comparing 2010's December index value with 2026's June value.

Rank	Metro	Administrative seat	2010	2026	Change	R1m equivalent (2026) *	Ref
1	City of Cape Town	Cape Town	48.4	139.8	▲188.8%	R2.89 million	
2	National	–	59.7	128.5	▲115.2%	R2.15 million	
3	Nelson Mandela Bay	Gqeberha	61.3	121.6	▲98.4%	R1.98 million	
4	Tshwane	Pretoria	61.8	117.6	▲90.3%	R1.90 million	
5	Mangaung	Bloemfontein	69.6	129.0	▲85.3%	R1.85 million	
6	Ekurhuleni	Germiston	66.3	119.6	▲80.4%	R1.80 million	
7	eThekwini	Durban	64.6	114.4	▲77.1%	R1.77 million	
8	Buffalo City	East London	63.5	109.6	▲72.6%	R1.73 million	
9	City of Johannesburg	Johannesburg	63.4	109.4	▲72.6%	R1.73 million	

* This column illustrates the equivalent value in June 2026 of a hypothetical residential property valued at R1 million in December 2010, assuming its price changed at the same rate as the relevant RPPI. These figures do not represent actual property valuations.

== See also ==
- Housing in South Africa
