= Housing in South Africa =

Housing in South Africa includes both modern (contemporary) and traditional (historic) styles. The two most common forms of residences in South Africa are the detached house and the multi-unit building. These may be owned by an individual, jointly owned, owned in a sectional title format, or owned by a corporation. Homes may be lived in by their owners, or rented to tenants.

The country has a strong real estate market, especially in major cities (metros). Owning a home in South African society is aspirational, and in many local markets is a form of investment. The rate of return on purchasing property varies greatly between the country's largest cities, with Cape Town having been the strongest-performing property market for many years.

== Home types ==
There are various kinds of homes in South Africa, with varying levels of popularity depending on the city and suburb. These include:

- Detached houses, usually found in predominantly residential areas, such as suburbs away from commercial nodes
- Low-rise apartment buildings, which are often older, and found in residential areas
- Townhouses, found mainly in residential areas
- High-rise apartment buildings, often newer, and generally located in central business districts, which are multi-use areas
- Gated communities, which are usually built by a single developer, and sometimes include in-community amenities

For a building to be habitable (permitted for residential use), it must be zoned as such. In other words, residing in a commercial or industrial space is not permitted. Thus, municipalities zone land for various uses, such as residential-only, commercial-only, industrial-only, mixed-use developments, public parkland, national parks, and government-use.

== Property prices ==
Average property prices vary greatly across major cities in South Africa, and are generally cheaper in rural areas. Within major cities, like Cape Town, Durban, and Johannesburg, prices again vary greatly between different suburbs and regions.

This variance is to the degree that one kind of property in a particular area can be priced significantly more than a different kind of property in another. For example, in the context of Cape Town, the city with the highest average property prices in South Africa, an apartment in a central, safe, peaceful Southern Suburb like Bergvliet is valued far higher than a detached house in a far-out Northern Suburb like Parow.

In Q1 2026, the average home price in South Africa was R1.73 million - an increase of 4.7% year-over-year. There is a continued shift in the SA real estate market towards the purchase of mid- and high-priced homes.

As of 2025, average prices (ranked in descending order) across some of the largest South African cities by population were as follows:

| City | Province | Metro population (2022 Census) | Average home price (ZAR) | Year-over-year change | Ref |
|---|---|---|---|---|---|
| Cape Town | Western Cape | 4.77 million | R2.23 million | ▲10.52% | |
| Pretoria | Gauteng | 2.92 million | R1.27 million | ▲6.72% | |
| Johannesburg | Gauteng | 6.19 million | R1.2 million | ▲9.09% | |
| Bloemfontein | Free State | 747,000 | R1.01 million | ▲3.06% | |
| Gqeberha | Eastern Cape | 1.15 million | R945,000 | ▲5.11% | |
| Durban | KwaZulu-Natal | 4.23 million | R940,000 | ▲3.86% | |
| Pietermaritzburg | KwaZulu-Natal | 839,000 | R930,000 | Steady | |
| Total | - | 20.84 million | R1.26 million (Average) | ▲6.39% (Average) | - |

=== Cape Town ===
Cape Town has long been South Africa's strongest property market, with the city having annual home value increases of around 10%, which is well above other major cities in SA. In late 2024, Cape Town had an average property price of R2.23 million. Sellers in Cape Town often get their asking price, and the city is seen as a secure location to invest in the real estate market.

In June 2025, it was reported in South Africa's Residential Property Price Index (RPPI) that Cape Town's property values had not only increased by significantly more than the national average, but had also increased by around 4 times as much as second-place Johannesburg's.

To afford the average home in Cape Town, a salary of over R80,000 per month is required, which is significantly higher than in other provinces, and around three times the South African national average salary.

Cape Town's Southern Suburbs and Atlantic Seaboard command the highest prices for all types of residential property.

== Features ==
Homes in South Africa are all equipped with the South African SANS 164 220/230V, 50 Hz AC plug sockets, and new builds are required to use the new SANS 164-2 (ZA plug) socket type. All houses receive a 220/230V supply, and the maximum wattage obtainable from a standard plug socket, at 16A, is 3,680 watts. However, houses may opt to have industrial-type outlets installed, for higher power output, such as to use for at-home DC charging for electric vehicles (EVs) at up to 22 kW.

With moderate climates, ranging from Mediterranean in Cape Town to Subtropical in Durban, SA does not have a system of piped gas for heating, nor is whole-home heating or cooling (ducted HVAC) common. Instead, homes are often built with pitched roofs, insulation above the ceiling, and make use of portable or wall-mounted heaters for winter, and multi-split heat pump air conditioners for summertime.

South Africa's homes are predominantly built out of brick, bonded together with concrete. Fired bricks are exceptionally popular. Made from a mixture of clay, sand, and water, the bricks are molded and then fired in a kiln to harden them. Clay bricks provide durability, fire resistance, low maintenance, and energy efficiency. They also provide homes with warm, earthy color tones, which some homeowners prefer. Clay bricks have been used in South African home construction for centuries, and remain widely used.

South Africa has some of the most technologically-advanced and energy-efficient brick-making operations in the world, which reduce the costs of bricks used for the construction of homes.

Exterior walls generally receive two layers of brick, and interior walls generally receive a single layer. This makes South African homes exceptionally durable, ironically in a region that is essentially devoid of major natural disasters. However, these materials are used in part as they are abundant, and homes in SA are not viewed as disposable assets, but rather long-term investments.

Internet in South Africa is widespread, and many homes have a fiber optic connection. For those that don't, satellite internet is an option. In terms of entertainment, South Africans have shifted away over the years from using analog aerials for TV, and dish-type receivers for satellite TV, towards using smart TVs and TV boxes for streaming services.

Vehicle ownership is high in South Africa, and homeowners tend to park their cars at home. Many households have more than one car for personal use. Thus, many homes (detached and multi-unit formats) have garages and/or carports for protecting vehicles from the elements, and off-street driveways for additional parking space.

== Mortgages ==
It is common for South Africans to purchase their homes by means of a mortgage (home loan). Applicants can choose to deal with their main financial institution, or poll multiple banks to see which one offers them a better interest rate and term. Most major banks in SA, including commercial and private banks, offer home loans. Qualifying criteria naturally varies between institutions. Some banks do not require the purchaser to move other forms of banking to their institution in order to grant them a mortgage.

It is also possible to, at no cost to the purchaser, use the services of a mortgage broker (sometimes called a bond originator). In this case, the broker does the work of contacting banks and finding the best deals, saving admin for the purchaser. The broker is paid by the financial institutions, in the form of client referral fees.

As mortgage brokers interface regularly with major banks, they understand how each company approves mortgages, how they each assess risk, and the types of clients each company prefers. Brokers also know how to properly structure a home loan application. Thus, by using this knowledge, brokers may be able to increase the chances of mortgage approval for purchasers. The services of a mortgage broker may therefore be especially useful for first-time home buyers.

As part of due diligence, financial institutions will perform background checks on applicants, assessing, among other things, their credit scores, overall financial position, as well as income and expenses. Banks also factor in any deposit the purchaser is willing to pay. These things will also be assessed for a co-applicant, such as a spouse or business partner, if more than one person is involved in the application.

=== Approvals ===
A Q1 2026 report showed that the approval rate for those applying for mortgages was roughly 84%, an increase of 0.5% year-over-year. The approval rate for those who submitted an application to just one bank was 68.5%.

The average mortgage approval amount was R1.51 million - roughly 12.7% lower than the average home purchase price at the time. The average deposit paid as part of a mortgage was roughly R222,000.

The average age of first-time home buyers in South Africa is 35. Across all home purchases, the average age is 40. The total number of first-time home buyers reached a multi-year high in Q1 2026. In that quarter, first-time purchasers accounted for 48% of all mortgage applications.

Applicants can request preapproval (an estimate) from financial institutions, so that they have mortgage approval ready when they find a suitable property. This saves application-based delays when the buyer is trying to secure their home of choice, in what is sometimes (such as in the case of Cape Town), a highly competitive real estate market.

== Home ownership ==
=== Current stats ===
A 2022 report showed that South Africa has 6.7 million residential properties, collectively worth R5.96 trillion. The most valuable area for housing stock is Cape Town. Around 70% of South African residents own the home they live in.

Around 60% of residential properties in South Africa are owned by women, who also outnumber men as first-time home buyers. In 2025, it was predicted that women will initiate 70% of South African home purchases by 2030.

=== Survey data ===
In a March 2025 Ipsos survey, 92% of South Africans agreed that everyone has a right to own their own home. This is significantly higher than the global average of 78%, and places South Africa among the top countries globally in terms of home ownership aspirations. 89% of South African renters said they would like to own their own home, which is higher than the global average of 71%.

In the same survey, 72% of South Africans stated that they believe it is harder for their generation to buy or rent a home compared to their parents' generation, aligning with the global average. 81% of South Africans said property prices have increased in the past 12 months, while 82% expect prices to rise in the next 12 months. Furthermore, 84% anticipated higher rents in the coming year.

When asked what the most important characteristics were that a home should have if they were to purchase it, South Africans responded with safety most commonly, seconded by a good location, while value for money was in a close third place.

In terms of the type of home South Africans want, the survey showed that 34% of South Africans preferred to own a detached home in the suburbs (well above the global average of 19%), while 22% preferred an apartment in the suburbs (above the global average of 10%), and 16% preferred a detached home outside the city (below the global average of 22%).

For those who do rent, reasons provided in a similar survey in Q4 2025 included needing a place to stay while renovating, avoidance of maintenance costs or transfer fees, and not being able to afford to buy a home. In the same survey, around half (46%) of respondents said South Africans should buy instead of rent, if they can afford to do so.

=== Purchasing process ===
South African homes can be sold privately or via a realtor. There are many locally based and international real estate agencies operating in the country, including RE/MAX, Seeff, Fine and Country, Sotheby's, Rawson, Chas Everitt, Knight Frank, Century 21, and Just Property. SA has two major online aggregator websites for viewing properties across realtors; property24 and PrivateProperty.

Homes can be purchased for cash, via a mortgage from a commercial bank, or by some combination of both. Regardless, when this is done, a title deed needs to be transferred into the buyer's name, to prove ownership of the property. For this to happen, a lawyer specializing in property transfers (conveyancer) needs to action the transfer.

The South African Revenue Service (SARS) charges a transfer duty to the seller during the purchasing process, which works as a progressive percentage. As of 2022, properties priced under R1 million attract no transfer duty. On the high end, properties valued at R11 million or more attract a duty of R1,026,000 plus 13% of the value above R11 million.

The seller also pays 14% VAT and realtor fees when selling. The latter may be as low as 1% or as high as around 8%.

There are also legal fees involved with selling a home. The buyer pays the conveyancer, and may also end up paying a legal firm appointed by the bank, called a mortgage attorney, if they finance their home.

Generally, commercial banks require mortgage insurance to be taken out. At times, this is mandatory to take from the bank granting the loan. Buyers may also opt to take out property insurance with a private insurer, to protect their home in the event of damage, as well as home contents insurance, to protect their personal property stored inside the home from damage.

After this process is complete, the Registrar of Deeds signs the transfer, and the Deeds Office closest to the new owner keeps a copy of the title deed. A title deed can prove ownership of various kinds of property in South Africa, such as a freestanding home, sectional title unit, garage or parking bay, vacant land, or entire apartment building.

Once an individual owns a property, they are able to apply for architectural plans, make alterations to it (such as renovations), rebuild the property entirely, apply to rezone the land, and sell the property to someone else whenever they wish, subject to any standard bylaws in their municipality.

Foreigners are free to buy property in SA, subject to meeting the visa requirements to live and work in the country. Mortgages are generally capped at 50% for foreign buyers, and all foreign purchasers need the approval of the South African Reserve Bank (SARB) before the transaction can take place.

Houses tend to sell within two months of being listed, however this varies a lot according to location. For example, certain suburbs in attractive property markets, such as Cape Town, have residential properties selling as quickly as within a few days of being listed, or even selling by direct viewing with a realtor, before being listed online.

== Affordable housing ==
Affordable housing in South Africa refers to housing that is considered economically accessible for individuals and families whose household income falls at or below specific ranges, as evaluated by either national or local government authorities. The term is used in various ways depending on the region and level of government, but generally refers to housing catering to low to moderate income households.

At the national level, affordable housing is available to households earning within a certain income range. As of 2025, this is between R1,850 and R22,000 per month. This equates to a range from around half the national median salary, to just below the national average salary.

Metropolitan municipalities (the country's largest cities) have their own ways of using the term. For example, in Cape Town, affordable housing is defined as residences catering to households earning an income of below R32,000 per month, which is slightly above the national average salary. For context, as of 2025, the national median salary is R5,400, and the national average salary is R29,290.

In the context of new builds (a key part of tackling a lack of affordable housing), affordable housing may refer to units priced a certain percentage below average market rates for similar homes. South Africa has a robust state-funded housing system that provides a mix of subsidized housing (free homes for low income earners), social housing (reduced cost rentals for low income earners), and other programs. The country has affordable housing programs driven by initiatives at the national, provincial, and local government levels.

== Rental market ==
According to the Q2 2024 TPN Residential Vacancy Survey, South Africa's average national vacancy rate was 5.57%, a significant reduction of 17.21% from the previous year. Certain provinces, like the Western Cape and Gauteng, have lower vacancy rates than the national average.

Average rental prices vary significantly between provinces, with the highest average rent in the Western Cape, and particularly Cape Town, and the lowest average in the North West.

== Existing builds ==
The 2021 CAHF National Housing Market Report stated that there were a total of around 6.74 million residential properties in South Africa. Approximately 60% of those properties were located in one of SA's eight metro areas. Of those houses, the spread across the country's provinces was as follows:

Gauteng had the highest number of residential properties, followed by the Western Cape, and KZN, aligning with the ranking of provincial populations.

For low-cost housing (residences under R600,000), Gauteng contained the most, followed by the Eastern Cape. Gauteng also contained the highest number of subsidized housing units, however in terms of the highest ratio of subsidized housing units, the Northern Cape, followed by the Free State, contained the most, at 48% and 46% of total residences respectively.

When it came to the mid-market (homes valued from R600,000 to R1.5 million), Gauteng again contained the most, followed by KZN and the Western Cape.

In terms of high-value housing, the Western Cape and Gauteng contained most of South Africa's homes worth over R1.5 million. The Western Cape contained the most homes worth over R3 million.

Of South Africa's 6.74 million total residential properties in 2021, the spread across the country's provinces was as follows:

| Province | Largest city | Total number of residential properties * | Percentage of total residential properties * |
|---|---|---|---|
| Eastern Cape | Gqeberha | 682,000 | 10.1% |
| Free State | Bloemfontein | 514,000 | 7.6% |
| Gauteng | Johannesburg | 2.34 million | 34.7% |
| KwaZulu-Natal | Durban | 872,000 | 12.9% |
| Limpopo | Polokwane | 224,000 | 3.3% |
| Mpumalanga | Mbombela | 378,000 | 5.6% |
| North West | Rustenburg | 334,000 | 4.9% |
| Northern Cape | Kimberley | 185,000 | 2.7% |
| Western Cape | Cape Town | 1.19 million | 17.6% |
| Total | - | 6.74 million * | 100% * |

* Approximate

== New builds ==
Stats SA reported that over roughly a decade, from 2014 through 2023, around 250,000 new homes were built across SA's five largest metro areas.

Cape Town built the most new homes by far, at just under 97,000. Despite representing 21% of the total population of the five largest metros, Cape Town built roughly 40% of the total new homes.

The table below shows new builds over the period 2014 through 2023, across the five major metros, split by home type.

| Metro | Largest city | Metro population (2022 Census) | New detached houses | New townhouses | New condos* | Total new homes built | Percentage of total new builds |
|---|---|---|---|---|---|---|---|
| City of Cape Town | Cape Town | 4.77 million | 52,887 | 5,434 | 38,404 | 96,725 | 38.89% |
| City of Tshwane | Pretoria | 2.92 million | 25,366 | 16,207 | 13,522 | 55,095 | 22.15% |
| Ekurhuleni | Germiston | 4.06 million | 30,769 | 7,577 | 5,974 | 44,320 | 17.82% |
| City of Johannesburg | Johannesburg | 6.19 million | 18,714 | 20,899 | 553 | 40,166 | 16.15% |
| eThekwini | Durban | 4.23 million | 4,564 | 2,876 | 4,941 | 12,381 | 4.97% |
| Total | - | 22.17 million | 132,301 | 52,993 | 63,394 | 248,687 | 100% |

* In a South African context, condos are the same as "sectional title" residences.

== Rates ==
All owners of property in South Africa, unless specifically exempted from doing so, are obligated to pay rates to their municipality. These rates are billed to owners, and based on municipal valuation rolls, which are, by law, conducted and updated every four to five years.

These rates are determined by property type and, at times, ownership type. Rates are determined at the municipal level, and municipalities are obligated to collect rates, as per the Municipal Property Rates Act of 2004 (MPRA). They are enabled to do so by the Constitution of South Africa - specifically, by Sections 8 and 15.

Municipal property valuations often vary greatly from real estate market values and bank values. Each of the three serves a different purpose. Municipal valuations aim for consistency across large property portfolios (i.e., all properties within municipal boundaries). Market values reflect what buyers actually pay in real transactions; namely, the fair market value of a property. Bank values prioritize mortgage lending security. For market and bank valuations, date specificity is highly important.

Municipal valuations are published publicly in General Valuations Rolls (GVRs).

The collection of rates is important for municipal finances, in that the rates can be used by municipalities for a variety of functions that serve residents. For example, they may be used for the provision of municipal services, or for the undertaking of large-scale public infrastructure projects.

== Regulations ==
The South African housing market is regulated by strict legislation, which is set by the Department of Human Settlements, headed by the Minister of Human Settlements.

=== Construction and protection ===
South African building codes are governed by the National Building Regulations and Building Standards Act, 1977 (Act No. 103 of 1977), which enforces standards outlined in the SANS 10400 series. The act was most recently amended in 2008 (National Building Regulations 2008).

These standards, developed by the South African Bureau of Standards (SABS), cover a broad range of construction aspects. It is a legal requirement for all new construction, and alterations to existing structures, to comply with these regulations.

The National Heritage Resources Act (Act 25 of 1999) provides for the protection and management of conservation-worthy places, and promotes proper management of heritage resources.

=== Real estate practices ===
In terms of the SA real estate market, realtors and their processes are governed by the Property Practitioners Act (22 of 2019) and enforced by the Property Practitioners Regulatory Authority (PPRA). The act serves to protect consumers when they are selling, purchasing, leasing, hiring, or financing immoveable property, or a business undertaking.

Among other things, realtors need to:

- Register with the PPRA
- Possess a valid Fidelity Fund Certificate (FFC)
- Meeting educational requirements (NQF4 and PDE4)
- Maintain a trust account with annual audits
- Adhere to a real estate practitioner code of conduct
- Continuous Professional Development (CPD), certified every 3 years

The Property Practitioner's Regulatory Authority (PPRA) is the regulating body for realtors in South Africa. It was established in 1976, via the enactment of the Estate Agency Affairs Act 112 of 1976 (EAAA). The act protects the interests of the public and ensures that realtors are compliant.

Realtors can only act on a property if they have an explicit mandate from the seller, lessor, buyer, or lessee. Sole mandates, where a realtor has exclusive rights to act on a property, must be in writing, with specific terms and a fixed expiry date.

== See also ==
- Residential Property Price Index
- Construction industry in South Africa
- List of populated places in South Africa
- South African property law
- General Household Survey (South Africa)
