= House price index =

Measure of the price changes of residential housing

A house price index (HPI) measures the price changes of residential housing as a percentage change from some specific start date (which has an HPI of 100). Methodologies commonly used to calculate an HPI are hedonic regression (HR), simple moving average (SMA), and repeat-sales regression (RSR).

== Indices by country ==
=== Africa ===
==== South Africa ====
In South Africa, the national government agency Statistics South Africa publishes a monthly Residential Property Price Index (RPPI). Data has been recorded for the index since 2010.

=== Asia ===
==== India ====
In India, National Housing Bank completely owned by Reserve Bank of India computes an index termed NHB RESIDEX. The index was formulated based on a pilot study covering 5 cities, Delhi, Mumbai, Kolkata, Bangalore and Bhopal representing the five regions of the country. Actual transactions prices are used to compute an Index reflecting the market trends.

2007 is taken as the base year for the study to be comparable with the WPI and CPI, although alternative variants using 2012 and 2017 as the base years are also calculated.

Some of the cities covered are Delhi with NCR, Bangalore, Mumbai, Kolkata, Bhopal, Hyderabad, Faridabad, Patna, Ahmedabad, Chennai, Jaipur, Lucknow, Pune, Surat, Kochi, Bhubaneshwar, Guwahati, Ludhiana, Vijayawada, Indore, Chandigarh, Coimbatore, Dehradun, Meerut, Nagpur and Raipur. The list of cities covered in the index is gradually expanding.

=== Europe ===
==== Ireland ====
In the Republic of Ireland, the Central Statistics Office publishes a monthly Residential Property Price Index. Up until 2011, Permanent TSB and the Economic and Social Research Institute published a similar monthly houseprice index.

==== United Kingdom ====
House Price Indices (HPIs) have been produced in the UK since around 1973, initially by mortgage providers and more recently by government bodies. More recently, they have come from property market websites.

===== Governmental house price indices =====
- In June 2016, the UK House Price Index (UK HPI)[1] was launched as a collaboration between the Office for National Statistics, HM Land Registry, Registers of Scotland, and Land and Property Services Northern Ireland. The index is calculated using land registration data (such as HM Land Registry). The UK HPI release provides comprehensive information on the change in house prices monthly and annually. It also includes analysis by geography, type of buyer, type of dwelling, property status (whether the property is a new build or not), and funding status (cash or mortgage). Several guidance documents[2] are published alongside the release explaining its methodology and the difference between the different sources of official house price statistics.
- From 2012 to 2016, the Office for National Statistics produced a monthly House Price Index (HPI) release, calculated using mortgage financed transactions collected via the Regulated Mortgage Survey by the Council of Mortgage Lenders. These covered the majority of mortgage lenders in the UK. The UK House Price Index replaced this release in June 2016.[3]
- Historically, HM Land Registry also published a separate house price index calculated by Calnea Analytics. It used the HM Land Registry's data, which consists of the transaction records of all residential property sales in England and Wales. It uses Repeat Sales Regression. The UK House Price Index replaced this release in June 2016.
- DCLG House Price Index [4] by the Department of Communities and Local Government used the mix-adjusted method based on weighted averages. The data used in this HPI was mortgage completion data supplied by a few giant lenders. DCLG handed the production of this index to the Office for National Statistics in 2012
- A House Price Index used to be produced by the Department for the Environment.

===== Private sector house price indices =====
- The Nationwide House Price Index and Halifax House Price Index use Hedonic regression (also known as the characteristics based method) using their own datasets compiled from their mortgage lending. These indices have a longer time-series than the Governmental HPIs.

===== Current UK indices =====
Index	Calculated by	Source data	Observations (approx)	Quality Adjustment Method	Local Indices	Frequency	Price Observations
UK House Price Index	Office for National Statistics	HM Land Registry	100k	HR	Yes	Monthly	Actual price paid
HM Land Registry	Calnea Analytics	HM Land Registry	100k	RSR	Yes	Monthly	Actual price paid
Knight Frank	Knight Frank	Knight Frank	100k	RSR	Yes	Monthly	-
DCLG	DCLG	Lender data	45k	SMA	Regional Only	Monthly	Mortgage completions
Halifax	Halifax	Loan approvals	12k	HR	Regional Only	Monthly	Price agreed at time of loan approval
Nationwide	Nationwide	Loan approvals	12k	HR	Regional Only	Monthly	Price agreed at time of loan approval
FindaProperty.com	Calnea Analytics	Rental prices	Undisclosed	HR	Regional Only	Monthly	Rental prices
Home.co.uk	Calnea Analytics	Asking prices online	800k	SMA	Regional Only	Monthly	Asking price
Pinerock Finance	Pinerock Finance	HM Land Registry	28m	RSR & SMA	Yes	Monthly	Actual price paid
Rightmove	Rightmove	Asking prices online	Undisclosed	SMA	Regional Only	Monthly	Asking price
Financial Times	Acadametrics	Land Registry	100k	SMA	Yes	Monthly	Actual price paid

=== North America ===
==== Canada ====
In Canada, the New Housing Price Index is calculated monthly by Statistics Canada. Additionally, a resale house price index is also maintained by the Canadian Real Estate Association, based on reported sale prices submitted by real estate agents, and averaged by region.

In December 2008, the private National Bank and the information technology firm Teranet began a separate monthly house price index based on resale prices of individual single-family houses in selected metropolitan areas, using a methodology similar to the Case-Shiller index and based on actual sale prices taken from government land registry databases.

This allows Teranet and the National Bank to track prices without allowing periods of high sales in one city to push up the national average. The National Bank also operates a forward market on Canadian housing prices.

==== United States ====
===== FHFA/OFHEO =====
The US Federal Housing Finance Agency (formerly Office of Federal Housing Enterprise Oversight, a.k.a. OFHEO) publishes the HPI index, a broad quarterly measure of the movement of single-family house prices.

The HPI is a weighted, repeat-sales index that measures average price changes in repeat sales or refinancings on the same properties in 363 metropolises. This information is obtained by reviewing repeat mortgage transactions on single-family properties whose mortgages have been purchased or securitized by Fannie Mae or Freddie Mac since January 1975.

Since the HPI index only includes houses with mortgages within the conforming amount limits, the index has a natural cap and does not account for jumbo mortgages.

The HPI was developed in conjunction with OFHEO's (now FHFA) responsibilities as a regulator of Fannie Mae and Freddie Mac. It is used to measure the adequacy of their capital against the value of their assets, which are primarily home mortgages.

On July 30, 2008, OFHEO became part of the new Federal Housing Finance Agency (FHFA). Accordingly, the index is now termed the FHFA HPI.

===== S&P/Case-Shiller indexes =====
The Case-Shiller index prices are measured monthly and track repeat sales of houses using a modified version of the weighted-repeat sales methodology proposed by Karl Case, Robert Shiller, and Allan Weiss. This means that, to a large extent, it can adjust for the quality of the homes sold, unlike simple averages.

The Case-Shiller index has a long lag time as a monthly tracking index. Typically, it takes about 2 months for S&P to publish the results, as opposed to 1 month for most other monthly indices and indicators. In addition, specific indexes are available for specific metropolitan areas and composite indexes for the top 20 and 10 metro areas nationwide.

===== FNC Residential Price Index =====
FNC Inc. publishes the Residential Price Index based on data collected from public records blended with real-time appraisals of property and neighborhood attributes. The RPI is the mortgage industry's first hedonic price index for residential properties. The RPI is constructed to gauge price movement among non-distressed home sales and excludes sales of foreclosed properties.[1]

The RPI has a lag time of about two months as a monthly tracking index. Specific indices are available for specific metropolitan areas, and composite indices are available for the top 10, 20, 30, and 100[2] metro areas. The RPI is also available at the zip code level and can be constructed to track price trends for specific characteristics (e.g., ranch-style house, colonial-style house, etc.) since preferences can change over time.

===== HouseCanary Home Price Index =====
HouseCanary publishes monthly HPI data at block, block group, zip code, metro division, and metropolitan levels. These indices include forecasts up to 3 years into the future.[1]

== See also ==
- Real estate appraisal

== Resources ==
- Downie, M. L. & Robson G. (2007) Automated Valuation Models: an international perspective. Pp 11 Council of Mortgage Lenders, London, ISBN 1-905257-12-0.
- Lim, S. & Pavlou M. (2007) An improved national house price index using Land Registry data RICS research paper series: Volume 7 Number 11. Pp 10–14. London, ISBN 978-1-84219-347-1. Accessed 21 November 2007.
- How is the HPI calculated? (2014) Accessed 9 May 2014
