= Toxic asset =

Assets with no value or available markets

A toxic asset is a financial asset that has significantly decreased in value and for which there is no longer a functioning market. These assets cannot be sold at a satisfactory price for the holder. Because assets are offset against liabilities and frequently leveraged, this decline in price may be quite dangerous to the holder. The term became common during the 2008 financial crisis, in which toxic assets played a major role.

When the market for toxic assets ceases to function, it is described as "frozen". Markets for some toxic assets froze in 2007, and the problem grew much worse in the second half of 2008. Several factors contributed to the freezing of toxic asset markets. The value of the assets was very sensitive to economic conditions, and increased uncertainty in these conditions made it difficult to estimate the value of the assets. Banks and other major financial institutions were unwilling to sell the assets at significantly reduced prices, since lower prices would force them to reduce significantly their stated assets, making them, at least on paper, insolvent.

Toxic assets are also euphemistically labeled troubled assets.

== Origin ==
The term was in limited use at least as early as 2006, and may have been coined by or popularized by Angelo Mozilo, founder of Countrywide Financial, who used the term "toxic" to describe certain mortgage products in emails in spring of 2006, as revealed in SEC filings:

"[The 100% loan-to-value subprime loan is] the most dangerous product in existence and there can be nothing more toxic..." (March 28, 2006)

Regarding Countrywide's subprime 80/20 loans:

"In all my years in the business I have never seen a more toxic product [sic]. It's not only subordinated to the first, but the first is subprime. In addition, the FICOs are below 600, below 500 and some below 400[.] With real estate values coming down ... the product will become increasingly worse." (April 17, 2006)

== Market freeze ==
When the supply and demand of a good equal each other, so buyers and sellers are matched, one says that the "market clears".

Classical economics and neoclassical economics posit that market clearing happens by the price adjusting—upwards if demand exceeds supply and downwards if supply exceeds demand. Therefore, it reaches equilibrium at a price that both buyers and sellers will accept, and, in the absence of outside interference (in a free market), this will happen.

This has not happened for many types of financial assets during the 2008 financial crisis, hence one speaks of "the market breaking down".

One can explain this alternately as the price not adjusting down—the price is too high, with supply being too high, or alternatively demand being too low, or by the theory of an equilibrium price not holding—the price at which sellers will sell is higher than the price at which buyers will buy.

Prior to the crisis, banks and other financial institutions had invested significant amounts of money in complicated financial assets, such as collateralized debt obligations and credit default swaps. The value of these assets was very sensitive to economic factors, such as housing prices, default rates, and financial-market liquidity. Prior to the crisis, the value of these assets had been estimated, using the prevailing economic data.

When it became clear that such conditions would not continue, it was no longer clear how much revenue the assets were likely to generate and, hence, how much the assets were worth. Since the assets were typically very sensitive to economic conditions, even relatively small uncertainties in the economic conditions could lead to large uncertainties in the value of the assets, which made it difficult for buyers and sellers in the market to agree on prices.

Furthermore, banks and other large financial institutions were reluctant to accept lower prices for these assets, since lower prices would force them to recalculate the total value of their assets, and, if the loss was sufficiently large, force them to declare a negative total value. Several banks in the autumn of 2008 were forced to accept buy-outs or mergers because it was believed that they were in this situation. This re-evaluation of total assets based on prevailing market prices is known as mark-to-market pricing. The term zombie bank was introduced to describe banks, which would have become bankrupt if their assets had been revalued at realistic levels. Toxic assets, by increasing the variance of banks' assets, can turn otherwise healthy institutions into zombies. Potentially solvent banks will make too few good loans. This is the debt overhang problem. Alternatively, potentially insolvent banks with toxic assets will seek out very risky speculative loans to shift risk onto their depositors and other creditors.

Further, insolvent banks with toxic assets are unwilling to accept significant reductions in the price of the toxic assets, but potential buyers were unwilling to pay prices anywhere near the loan's face value. With potential sellers and buyers unable to agree on prices, the markets froze with no transactions occurring. In some cases, markets remained frozen for several months.

== Geithner attempt at bail-out ==
On March 23, 2009, U.S. Treasury Secretary Timothy Geithner announced a Public-Private Investment Partnership (PPIP) to buy toxic assets from banks. The major stock market indexes in the United States rallied on the day of the announcement, rising by over six percent with the shares of bank stocks leading the way. PPIP has two primary programs. The Legacy Loans Program will attempt to buy residential loans from bank's balance sheets. The Federal Deposit Insurance Corporation (FDIC) will provide non-recourse loan guarantees for up to 85 percent of the purchase price of legacy loans. Private sector asset managers and the U.S. Treasury will provide the remaining assets. The second program is called the legacy securities program, which will buy mortgage backed securities (RMBS) that were originally rated AAA and commercial mortgage-backed securities (CMBS) and asset-backed securities (ABS) which are rated AAA. The funds will come in many instances in equal parts from the U.S. Treasury's Troubled Asset Relief Program (TARP) monies, private investors, and from loans from the Federal Reserve's Term Asset Lending Facility (TALF). The initial size of the Public Private Investment Partnership is projected to be $500 billion. Economist and Nobel Prize winner Paul Krugman has been very critical of this program, arguing that the non-recourse loans lead to a hidden subsidy that will be split by asset managers, bank shareholders, and creditors. Banking analyst Meridith Whitney argues that banks will not sell bad assets at fair market values because they are reluctant to take asset write downs. Removing toxic assets would also reduce the upward volatility of banks' stock prices. Because stock is a call option on a firm's assets, this lost volatility will hurt the stock price of distressed banks. Therefore, such banks will only sell toxic assets at above market prices.

However, that argument ignores the possibility of simultaneously adjusting bank liabilities by legislation or regulation, as requested in the September, 2009, $24 billion plan proposed by FDIC chair Sheila Bair, which would have shielded shareholders but could have led to non-astronomical management bonuses. Bair's plan was never implemented. Because the number of commercial bankruptcy filings continues to increase, there is evidence for negative feedback pressure indicating that toxic assets still need to be addressed.

== Types of assets ==
An example of a market which froze is the Canadian ABCP ("asset-backed credit paper") market. The term "toxic asset" is generally associated with financial instruments like CDOs ("collateralized debt obligations", assets generated from the resale of portions of a bank's mortgages), CDS ("credit default swaps"), and the subprime mortgage market—particularly the lower tranches—but the term does not have a precise definition.

== Related terms ==
Toxic security is the name applied during the aftermath of the subprime meltdown to financial instruments which cannot be readily identified as an asset or a liability. According to George Soros, "the toxic securities in question are not homogeneous". One example would be a credit default swap that entitles the holder to a regular stream of small payments but obliges the holder to make a large payment if a specified event occurs. John Gapper describes one such instrument, a "tail risk" swap:

...[S]tructured finance gave banks and others more chances to take on “tail risk”. This is an insurance-like trading strategy: one institution writes swaps or options that provide it with regular payments in exchange for taking another’s risk of default. In most cases, this produces profits, but occasionally it is disastrous.

The right to receive a stream of payments is accounted for as an asset. The obligation to make a payment is accounted for as a liability. In the case of a credit default swap, the number and amount of payments in and out is subject to an undetermined risk.

The net value of the expected cash flows is calculable by reference to a model, but the calculations require a degree of confidence in the probabilities of the named event occurring which may be unwarranted. "There is no doubt there could be disagreement on what the fair value for these securities is," said Lawrence Levine, director at RSM McGladrey.

== See also ==
- High-yield debt
- Subprime mortgage crisis
- Troubled assets relief program
- Home equity protection
