= PoliticIt =

American political podcast website

- Company type: Privately held company
- Industry: Online services
- Founded: November 2011; 14 years ago
- Headquarters: Logan Utah, USA
- Key people: Britney Johnson: Chief Technology Officer, Co-founder; John D. Johnson: Chairman of the Board, FNC Inc. Co-founder, Technical Scholar, PoliticIt angel Lauren Johnson: Chief Creative Officer, Co-founder; Joshua J. Light: Chief Executive Officer, Co-founder; Shai McDonald: Creative Director, Co-founder; Sterling Morris: Chief Marketing Officer, Co-founder
- Number of employees: 50
- Website: politicit.com

PoliticIt (/ˈpɒlɪˌtɪkɪt/ POL-i-tik-it) operates a website that features podcast covering gubernatorial, senatorial, and congressional candidates in all 50 U.S. states. PoliticIt has been headquartered in Logan, Utah since the company was first established. Some PoliticIt employees are remote workers.

The purpose of PoliticIt profiles is to promote political transparency. Political profiles for politicians contain a picture for each politician, graphs of data movements, a window to view the politician's website, the politician's English Wikipedia article, and news feeds from Google News, Yahoo!, and Bing News. A politician's profile also has an interface that displays his or her Facebook feed, Twitter feed, and YouTube videos. PoliticIt's campaign software provides business intelligence tools for political campaigns. It utilizes the It Score as well as several other performance metrics to allow campaigns to see how they are performing on a day-to-day basis. The It Score is a measure of a politician's digital influence. It is calculated by applying large data sets to machine learning software and techniques. The data collected comes from what people do and say in social networks, the real world, and the internet. The It Score has shown to correlate with election results.

== History ==
The website was launched in November 2011. It was initially designed to gather web content for each major politician running in the 2012 United States presidential election, assess the digital influence each politician has, and assign each politician an "It Score" which measures digital influence. PoliticIt has expanded its services to gubernatorial, senatorial, and congressional candidates in all 50 U.S. states after initially producing scores for Utah politicians. PoliticIt predicted more than 480 such races in 2012 with more than 91 percent accuracy. On PoliticIt.com, each candidate has a profile that contains background information, social network feeds, and local news. PoliticIt produced It Scores for the 2012 United States presidential election that indicated Barack Obama would win on Election Day.

The launch of PoliticIt.com allowed website users to evaluate how presidential candidates were performing against each other in their campaign efforts. After the launch of the PoliticIt website in November 2011, PoliticIt began developing It Scores for congressional, senatorial, and gubernatorial candidates for each of the 50 U.S. states. Members of the PoliticIt team also began programming an iPhone game entitled "Race for the White House."

PoliticIt received media attention after it accurately predicted each of the congressional, gubernatorial, and senatorial races in Utah at both the Republican and Democratic state conventions. By May 2012, PoliticIt had predicted unofficial primary election results in North Carolina, Indiana, Wisconsin, and West Virginia with 87% accuracy by using the It Score.

PoliticIt continued to track state primary races throughout the U.S. through 2012. By August, 2012, PoliticIt had correctly predicted more than 200 races with a continued approximate 87 percent accuracy.

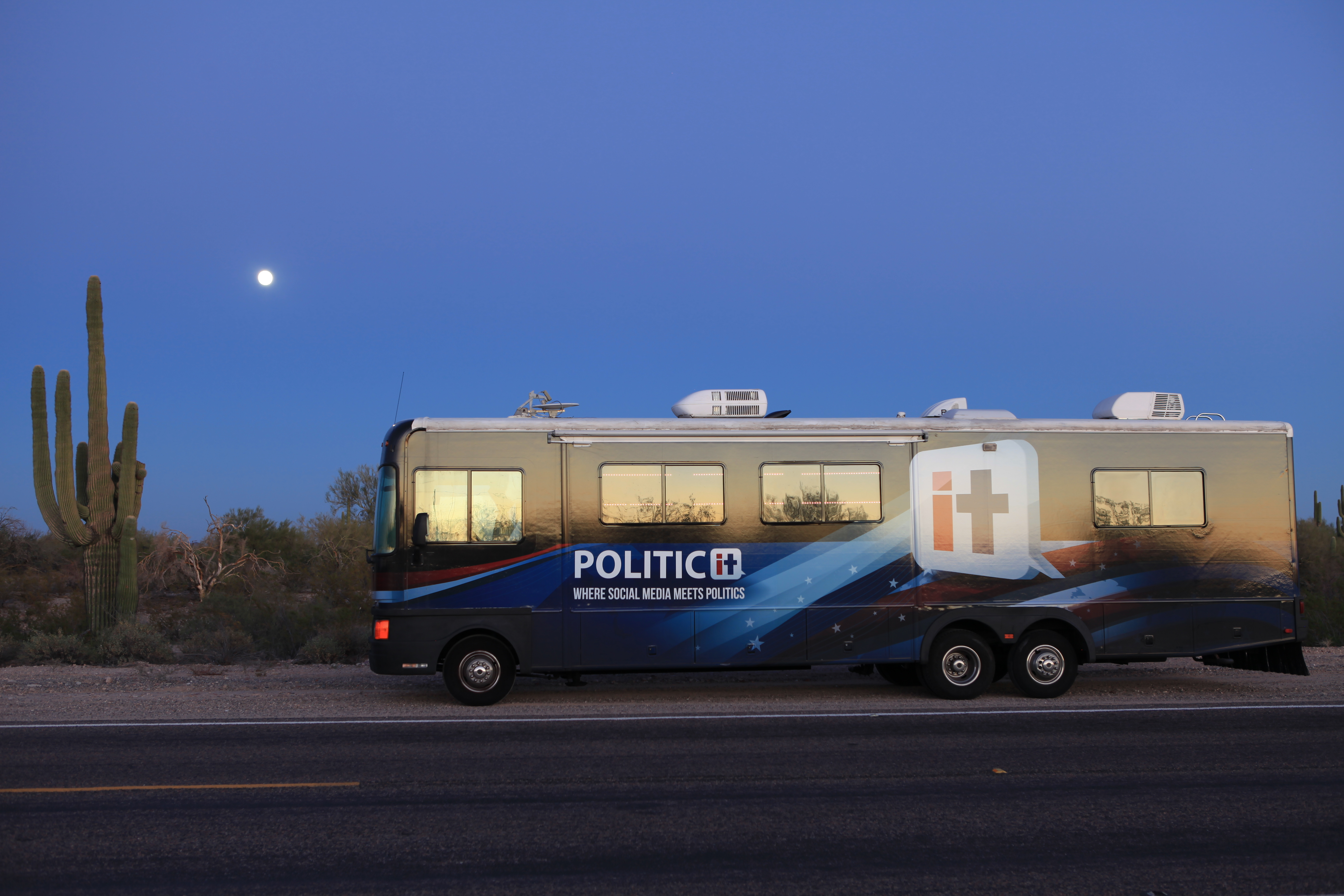
PoliticIt Mobile bus pictured in Arizona.

The company organized a national tour in a 34-foot Motorhome beginning on August 17, 2012, where it invited and interviewed every congressional, gubernatorial, and U.S. senate candidate in the Contiguous United States. Company representatives met with more than 200 candidates and produced video interviews which were shared on its YouTube channel in an attempt to create greater political transparency. Company representatives visited each state in the Contiguous United States conducting these interviews between August 17, 2012, and election day, November 6, 2012. The PoliticIt Mobile bus travelled more than 18,000 miles on the trip.

Prior to the 2012 elections on November 6, PoliticIt produced It Scores for nearly all U.S. Senate, congressional, and gubernatorial races. PoliticIt's It Scores were approximately 91% accurate in predicting the winner of each race it attempted to predict.

PoliticIt provided live social media analysis coverage on election night in Salt Lake City, Utah on two of Utah's major networks including NBC-affiliated KSL-TV and CBS-network affiliate KUTV.

== Awards ==
In December 2011, PoliticIt was selected along with 19 other startups to compete for $100,000 in to the Intel Innovators Competition. PoliticIt made it to the final round featuring the top five startups in the nation where PoliticIt's team members won a laptop computer.

PoliticIt received $5,000 as a part of an award from an elevator pitch competition its founders participated in at Utah State University in October, 2011 where more than 30 other teams competed.

In March, 2012, PoliticIt was named one of four emerging companies in Utah in the Utah Student 25 Competition.

PoliticIt was selected as one of 10 startups in the nation to compete at CrowdStart startup pitch competition. On September 14, PoliticIt competed for $500,000. Text Me Tix won the competition.
