= Cotality =

American business data company

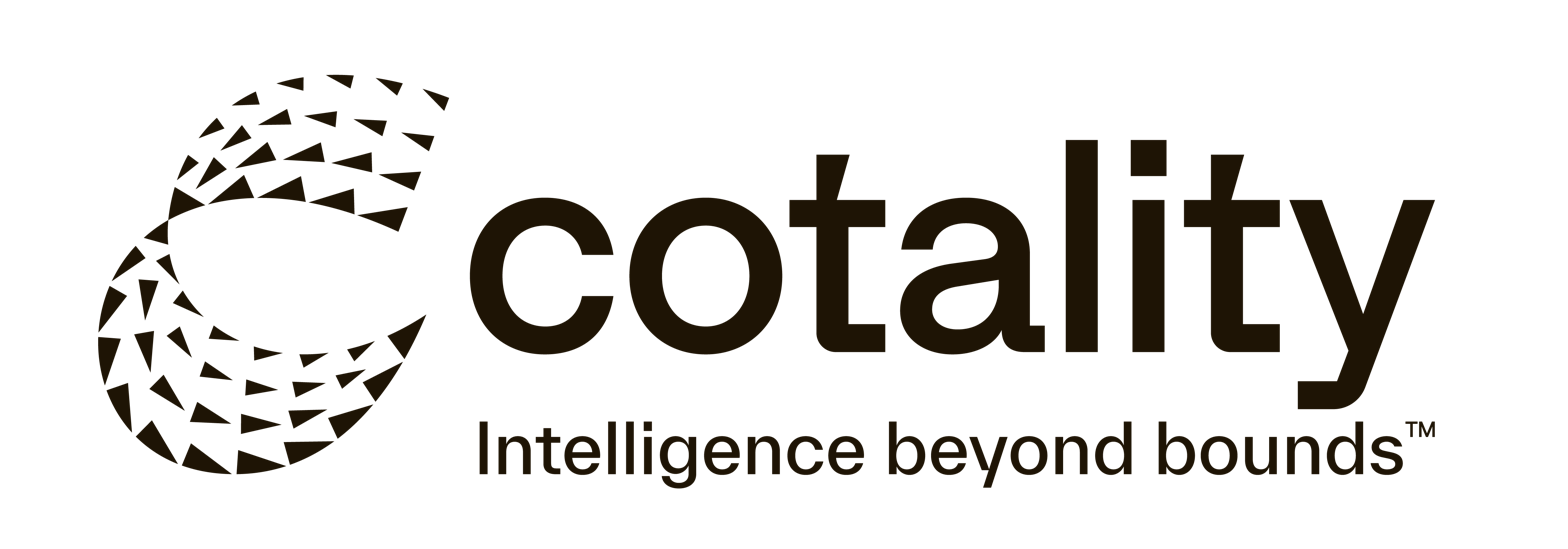

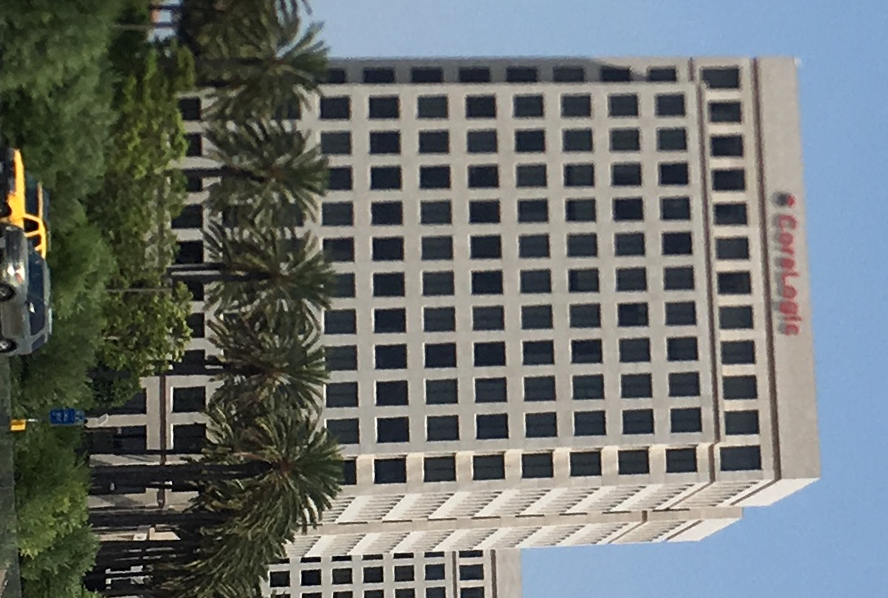
- Cotality's Irvine CA headquarters
- Type: Private
- Industry: Financial services
- Founded: California, USA (2010)
- Headquarters: Irvine, California, U.S.
- Key people: Patrick Dodd, President and CEO
- Products: Financial, property and consumer information, analytics and business intelligence
- Revenue: ▼US$1.762 billion (2019); ▼US$1.788 billion (2018)
- Operating income: ▼US$165.54 million (2019); ▼US$222.62 million (2018)
- Net income: ▼US$49.38 million (2019); ▼US$121.86 million (2018)
- Total assets: ▼US$4.159 billion (2019); ▲US$4.169 billion (2018)
- Total equity: ▼US$0.951 billion (2019); ▼US$1.000 billion (2018)
- Owner: Stone Point Capital; Insight Partners
- Number of employees: 5,100 (2019)
- Website: cotality.com

Cotality (CoreLogic Inc., doing business as Cotality) is an American-based information services provider of financial, property, and consumer information, analytics, and business intelligence. The company analyzes information assets and data to provide clients with analytics and customized data services. The company also develops proprietary research, and tracks current and historical trends in a number of categories, including consumer credit, international markets, real estate, fraud, regulatory compliance, natural hazards, and disaster projections. The company reported a full 2020 revenue of $1.6 billion. As of 2021, CoreLogic is a Fortune 1000 company.

In 2025, CoreLogic rebranded and changed its name to Cotality.

== History ==
Cotality dates back to September 1991, when TRW Real Estate Information Services entered into a partnership with three real estate information service units from Elsevier, the Dutch Publishing company now known as Reed Elsevier.

In September 1996, the group, then known as TRW Information Systems & Services, split away from its parent company and was renamed Experian.

In September 1997, majority ownership of Experian's real estate information business was acquired by The First American Corporation, in a partnership with Experian. The partnership was called FARES LLC and the new entity began operating under the name First American Real Estate Solutions (RES).

Also in 1997, Kraig Clark and Steve Schroeder co-founded C&S Marketing in Sacramento, CA. Created to provide fraud prevention and collateral risk management solutions to the mortgage banking industry, the company was later renamed as CoreLogic Systems.

In October 2003, First American RES acquired Transamerica's property information business, combining its real estate information and analytics businesses.

In February, 2007, First American Corporation acquired (via merger) CoreLogic Systems, Inc. The transaction was announced and effectively dated around February 5, 2007, when First American's Real Estate Solutions (RES) division merged with CoreLogic Systems, forming what became known as First American CoreLogic. This was a majority acquisition, with First American holding control through its FARES LLC subsidiary, while retaining some minority interest for CoreLogic's prior owners (management and TA Associates).

In March 2007, First American Corporation merged its First American RES subsidiary with CoreLogic Systems, under the FARES LLC subsidiary. The division began operating under the name First American CoreLogic.

In June 2010, CoreLogic, Inc. was established as a standalone business when The First American Corporation split its businesses to create two separate legal entities, CoreLogic, Inc and First American Corporation which provides title and financial services.

In January 2011, the company acquired Australia-RP Data, a provider of residential and commercial property information in Australia and New Zealand, for $194 million.

In March 2011, CoreLogic acquired Dorado Network Systems Corp, a San Mateo-CA based cloud application and architecture development company servicing the financial services industry.

In July 2011, the company sold its CoreLogic India operations to Cognizant, for $50 million. As part of the transaction, the companies also announced a five year, $324 million services agreement.

In January 2013 CoreLogic bought Middletown, CT-based CDS Business mapping, a provider of geospatial hazard reports including distance to coast, flood zones, rating territories, proximity to brush, wind pull eligibility and earthquake information. CoreLogic reported it would integrate the business into its existing Spatial Solutions business.

In April 2013, CoreLogic bought Case-Schiller, the producers of the Case-Shiller home price index, known as one of the most important measures of the health of the housing market.

In December 2013, CoreLogic acquired catastrophic modeling firm Eqecat from Texas-based ABS Group.

In December 2013, CoreLogic subsidiary Property IQ is given permission by the NZ Commerce Commission to acquire Terralink International, merging both into CoreLogic NZ.

In March 2014, CoreLogic acquired Marshall & Swift/Boeckh, a Milwaukee, WI-based provider of building cost information, residential and commercial analytics and business management services, San Diego, CA-based DataQuick Information Systems, a property data and analytics information company, and the credit and flood services operations of DataQuick Lending Solutions. The three acquired units were part of TPG Capital's Decision Insight Information Group.

In June 2014, CoreLogic expanded its hail, wind and lightning weather risk-management capabilities by acquiring Weather Fusion, formerly known as livehailmap.com.

In August 2015, the company purchased LandSafe Appraisal Services, an appraisal management company, from Bank of America for $122 million.

In October 2015, CoreLogic acquired Australian construction data business Cordell from Europe media group RELX, formerly known as Reed Elsevier.

In December 2015, the company acquired FNC, Inc., another provider of real estate appraisal services, for $475 million.

In January 2016, CoreLogic announced it was paying $65M to acquire total ownership of RELS, LLC, a provider of property valuation and appraisal services it owned in partnership with Wells Fargo.

In March 2017, its CEO Nallathambi died shortly after taking medical leave from the company. Shortly thereafter, the company announced Frank Martell as its new President and CEO.

In April 2018, CoreLogic acquired a la mode technologies, LLC, a real estate appraisal software company, for $120 million.

In May 2018, CoreLogic launched a non-weather-related fire and water risk solution.

In December 2018 CoreLogic purchased Symbility Solutions, Inc., a vendor of claims processing and estimating software based in Calgary, Alberta, Canada.

In June 2020, Cannae Holdings and Senator Investment Group launched a hostile takeover of CoreLogic. In response to CoreLogic raising quarterly guidance five days before the end of Q2 and following up on "nine months performing extensive 'outside-in' due diligence", Cannae Holdings and Senaro Investment Group submitted their proposal to acquire CoreLogic. CoreLogic replied on June 26 that, despite not having previous knowledge of the offer, they will "carefully review the proposal" and "determine the course of action it believes is in the best interests of the Company and its shareholders" and insisting that "shareholders need take no action at this time". Cannae and Senator Investment secured financing with Bank of America and announced in a regulatory filling, on June 30, they own enough of CoreLogic to call for a special meeting.

In June 2021, the company was acquired by Stone Point Capital and Insight Partners.

In September 2021, CoreLogic acquired Next Gear Solutions, LLC.

In March 2025, CoreLogic rebranded to Cotality.

In October 2026, Cotality released research stating that 2.5 million properties are at an elevated wildfire risk with six of the ten metro areas most affected being located in California.

== See also ==
- Black Knight (Company)
- Real estate appraisal
- Information broker
