= Zoe Longfield =

American painter

- Born: Zoe Golovinsky; 1924; San Francisco, California, U.S.
- Died: 2013 (aged 88–89); San Francisco, California, U.S.
- Education: University of California, Berkeley, California Labor School, San Francisco Art Institute
- Website: zoelongfield.com

Zoe Longfield (1924–2013) was an American abstract expressionist artist from the San Francisco Bay Area. She was among the first generation of Abstract Expressionists, which arose primarily in New York and San Francisco in the second half of the 1940s. She appears, with fellow student Frank Lobdell and others, in a 1948 photograph from the California School of Fine Arts (CSFA). During her few years of activity, Longfield produced a significant body of paintings, prints, and drawings showcasing a unique visual aesthetic.

== Early life ==
Zoe Longfield was born in San Francisco in 1924. She was the only child of Peter and Tatiana (Kasansava) Golovinsky, immigrants who fled Russia during the Russian Revolution. After her father's death, her mother again married her Russian fellow émigré, Maxim Dolgopoloff, who became Zoe's stepfather. In high school, Zoe changed her legal surname from Golovinsky to Longfield, a loose English translation of Dolgopoloff (dolgo = "long", pole = "field").

== Education ==
Zoe attended Edward Robeson Taylor Grammar School, Portola Junior High School, and Balboa High School. She was athletic and competed in numerous ice-skating exhibitions throughout her adolescence and early twenties.

After graduating from high school in 1941, she attended the University of California, Berkeley, from 1941 to 1944. There, she studied painting with Margaret Peterson, John Haley, and Erle Loran, who helped found the "Berkeley School" of abstract expressionism. After graduating with a Bachelor of Arts, she attended the California Labor School from 1946 to 1948 and then attended the California School of Fine Arts (the predecessor name of San Francisco Art Institute) from 1947 to 1949. At CSFA, she studied under a faculty whose members included Clyfford Still, Richard Diebenkorn, Edward Corbett, and Mark Rothko. One of only a few women in her class, she studied alongside Ernest Briggs, Edward Dugmore, Frank Lobdell, Horst Trave, and others.

== Art and influence ==
Embracing Clyfford Still's anti-commercial approach toward creativity, Longfield and eleven other students from his inner circle collaborated to open the landmark Metart Gallery in April 1949. Named from the "metamorphosis" or "metaphysical arts," the Metart Gallery was established as a cooperative in which each member, for a small monthly fee, had use of the entire space for one month per year in order to exhibit his or her works. Occupying a former laundry on Bush Street in downtown San Francisco, the gallery was the first of a series of such cooperative art galleries in San Francisco during the 1950s. Each taking a month to individually show original works were artists Jeremy Anderson, Ernest Briggs, W. Cohantz, Hubert Crehan, Edward Dugmore, Jorge Goya, William Huberich, Jack Jefferson, Kiyo Koizumi, Zoe Longfield, Frann Spencer, and Horst Trave.

Although the gallery closed after only a year, it helped to launch the artistic careers of several of its members, including Briggs and Dugmore. Exhibits at the Metart earned acclamatory reviews in the San Francisco Chronicle by the well-known art critics Alfred Frankenstein and R. H. Hagan. Of Longfield's show in December 1949, Hagan wrote, "Of all the numerous artists who have taken up the new credo of arbitrary (or spontaneous) expression in unrestrained colors and unrestrained shapes, Miss Longfield impresses me as one of the most successful." The gallery closed after a final exhibit by Clyfford Still in the spring of 1950. Still's final Metart exhibit was highly anticipated and well received. Soon after, he departed the San Francisco Bay Area for New York City.

Within the abstract idiom, Longfield experimented with both thicker and thinner paint applications. At times, she employed techniques borrowed from watercolor painting, applying thin washes of oil over the visible white primer of her canvases. She employed a unique vocabulary of forms, primarily organic but occasionally including more architectural elements. Hagan writes: "One of [Longfield’s paintings], titled No. 9, is a finely arranged creation of blues, blacks, and chalky white in which I, at least, detect something of a skull motif. I also enjoyed her symphonic treatment of bone-like shapes in powder blue and mustard yellow, labeled No. 4. But don’t press me for an explanation, it would be purely ectoplasmic."

Longfield painted a number of noteworthy paintings, including Untitled (1949), a large piece currently held in the Blair Collection of Bay Area Abstract Expressionism and promised as a gift to the Crocker Art Museum in Sacramento. Her work also appears in the catalog for the Women of Abstract Expressionism exhibit, organized by the Denver Art Museum.

== Later life ==
Longfield passed most of her life unrecognized as a painter. She died in 2013 in San Francisco from congestive heart failure.

Interest in her work was rekindled following the appearance of her painting, Untitled (1949), in the San Francisco and the Second Wave: The Blair Collection of Bay Area Abstract Expressionism exhibition at the Crocker Art Museum in 2004.

== Exhibitions ==
- Metart Galleries, San Francisco, 1949
- San Francisco and the Second Wave, Crocker Art Museum, Sacramento, 2004; Laguna Art Museum, Laguna Beach, 2004–2005; Monterey Museum of Art, Monterey, 2005; Fresno Art Museum, Fresno, 2005
