= Metropolitan municipality (South Africa) =

Second-level local government structure in South Africa

In South Africa, a metropolitan municipality or metro, is a municipality which executes all the functions of local government for a city or conurbation. This is in contrast to areas which are primarily rural, where the local government is divided into district municipalities and local municipalities.

There are a total of eight metros located in five of South Africa's nine provinces. The seats of some metros serve as provincial capitals, namely Cape Town, Johannesburg, and Bloemfontein. Three of SA's metros serve as the joint capitals of South Africa - Cape Town, Pretoria, and Bloemfontein.

== History ==
Metropolitan municipalities were brought about during reforms of the 1990s so that cities could be governed as single entities. For example, eThekwini (including Durban) is today a single municipality formed from what were more than 40 separate jurisdictions before 1994.

This reform process was a response to the way in which apartheid policy had broken up municipal governance. For example, Soweto had, until 1973, been administered by the Johannesburg City Council, but after 1973 was run by an Administration Board separate from the city council. This arrangement deprived Soweto of vital subsidies that it had been receiving from Johannesburg. A key demand of anti-apartheid civics in the 1980s was for 'one city, one tax base' in order to facilitate the equitable distribution of funds within what was a functionally integrated urban space.

Local government reform after apartheid produced six Transitional Metropolitan Councils following the 1995/6 local government elections. These were characterized by a two-tier structure. From 2000, these six Metropolitan Councils were restructured into their final single-tier form. In 2011, Buffalo City (including East London) and Mangaung (including Bloemfontein) were added to the category of metropolitan municipality.

== Authority ==
As per the Constitution of South Africa, municipalities have the right to manage, on their own initiative, the local government affairs of their communities. While national and provincial governments may supervise the functioning of local government, this must be done without encroaching on the institutional integrity of local government. The Constitution further allocates the functional areas of local government competency in Schedules 4B and 5B.

Metros operate via councils of elected officials, via local elections mandated to take place every five years. Each council manages its own municipal budget.

A metropolitan municipality has exclusive municipal executive and legislative authority in its area. Metro councils are permitted to decentralize their powers and functions. However, all original municipal, legislative, and executive powers are vested in the council. In metropolitan areas, there is a choice of the type of executive system used. The mayoral executive system vests executive authority in the mayor, whereas the collective executive committee system vests powers in the executive committee.

== Establishment ==
Section 155.1.a of the Constitution of South Africa established "Category A municipalities" as those which execute all the functions of local government for a city, and that have sufficient resources to perform municipal functions. In the Municipal Structures Act (MSA) it is laid out that this type of local government is to be used for conurbations, "centre[s] of economic activity", areas "for which integrated development planning is desirable", and areas with "strong interdependent social and economic linkages".

Category-A municipalities can only be established in metropolitan areas. A metro is created by notice of its respective provincial government, and only if that provincial government allows the creation of such.

== List of metropolitan municipalities ==
The table below lists the eight South African metropolitan municipalities, as of February 2026.

Name	Code	Province	Seat	Area (km^{2})	Population (2022)	Pop. density (per km^{2})
Buffalo City Metropolitan Municipality	BUF	Eastern Cape	East London	2,750	975,255	354
City of Cape Town Metropolitan Municipality	CPT	Western Cape	Cape Town	2,446	4,772,864	1,956
City of Johannesburg Metropolitan Municipality	JHB	Gauteng	Johannesburg	1,645	4,803,262	2,924
City of Tshwane Metropolitan Municipality	TSH	Gauteng	Pretoria	6,298	4,040,315	642
City of Ekurhuleni Metropolitan Municipality	EKU	Gauteng	Germiston	1,975	4,066,691	2,058
eThekwini Metropolitan Municipality	ETH	KwaZulu-Natal	Durban	2,556	4,239,901	1,659
Mangaung Metropolitan Municipality	MAN	Free State	Bloemfontein	9,886	811,431	82
Nelson Mandela Bay Metropolitan Municipality	NMA	Eastern Cape	Gqeberha	1,957	1,190,496	608

== Good governance ==
=== Average across metros ===
In recent years, metro governance has, on average, not been of a high quality, with some metro regions, such as the City of Johannesburg and eThekwini (where Durban is the seat) receiving criticism for failing infrastructure and mismanagement across multiple consecutive years. Johannesburg and Tshwane (where Pretoria is the seat) have had numerous consecutive years of political instability and failed coalitions, which have hampered municipal performance, economic growth, and general progress.

=== Cape Town's anomalous performance ===
The City of Cape Town stands in contrast to other metros. The city has for many years, across multiple ratings systems and metrics, been regarded as exceptionally well managed, and as South Africa's best-run metro. As of October 2025, Cape Town is the only metropolitan municipality considered financially sustainable, with no other metro coming close to matching the city's financial performance, according to Ratings Afrika.

In 2022's Ratings Afrika Municipal Financial Sustainability Index, the City of Cape Town had an operating surplus of R1.8 billion and cash reserves of R9.4 billion that could be utilized for infrastructure development and/or as a financial contingency. The index includes six financial components; operating performance, liquidity management, debt governance, budget practices, affordability, and infrastructure development. In the 2022 index, Cape Town scored 66% higher than the average of all the metros.

In 2024, 15 out of the 20 top-performing municipalities were located in the Western Cape province, of which Cape Town, as a metro region, is the capital. Cape Town has for numerous consecutive years been the only metro municipality to receive a clean audit. Audit reports such as the Good Governance Africa (GGA) Governance Performance Index (GPI) consider factors including administration and governance; economic development; leadership and management; planning, monitoring, and evaluation; and service delivery (the latter of which has the strongest weighting in the ranking system). In the 2024 GPI, the City of Cape Town was the top-ranked metro.

In 2025, the South African Property Owners Association (SAPOA) honored Cape Town as the Best Metropolitan Municipality. The convention's Municipal Performance Awards considered performance, innovation, and service delivery.

=== Political correlation ===
The Democratic Alliance, South Africa's second-largest political party and one that roots its ideology in good governance, has (as of 2026) managed the City of Cape Town for a continuous period of 26 years, as well as the Western Cape for a continuous period of 12 years. Thus, the party has for a significant period, been at the helm of the country's best-run city and best-managed province.

In September 2025, South African President and ANC Leader Cyril Ramaphosa said at a rally that South Africa’s best-run municipalities are those governed by the Democratic Alliance. He also stated that his own party should have no shame in traveling to the Western Cape to learn from the successes of municipalities like the City of Cape Town and Stellenbosch.

== Housing ==
As of 2021, approximately 60% of South Africa's 6.74 million residential properties were located in one of the country's eight metro areas.

At the time, most government-subsidized housing was situated in Gauteng, however in terms of the ratio of such housing, the Northern Cape, followed by the Free State, contained the highest percentage. Most low-cost (under R600,000) and mid-market (R600,000 to R1.5 million) housing was situated in Gauteng.

Meanwhile, most high-value (upmarket) homes, worth over R1.5 million, were located in the Western Cape. Cape Town, the capital of the Western Cape, is widely known to have South Africa's most robust property market. The city's residential property market has been ranked as the second-strongest-performing in the world.

== See also ==
- Urban planning in Africa
- Housing in South Africa

== Other sources ==
- Government Communication & Information Services (2005) Categories of municipalities
- Parliament of the Republic of South Africa (1996) Constitution of the Republic of South Africa, Chapter 7: Local Government
- Parliament of the Republic of South Africa (1998) Local Government: Municipal Structures Act, Act 117 of 1998.
- South African Local Government Association
