= Seeff =

Seeff is a surname. Notable people with the surname include:

- Lawrence Seeff (born 1959), South African cricketer
- Norman Seeff (born 1939), South African photographer and filmmaker

== See also ==
- Steff
