= Allan Weiss =

American financial analyst and economist

Allan E. Weiss
- Born: February 25, 1959 (age 67); Nyack, New York, U.S.
- Education: Brandeis University (B.A. in computer science and physics 1981); Yale (M.A. in public and private management 1989)
- Occupations: CEO/co-founder, Case Shiller Weiss, Inc. CEO/co-founder, Macro Securities; CEO/founder, Market Shield Capital, LLC
- Known for: S&P Case-Shiller Home Price Index, CASA

Allan Weiss (born February 25, 1959) is an American financial analyst and economist who is the founder and CEO of Weiss Analytics. He is co-founder and former CEO of Case Shiller Weiss, producer of the Standard & Poor's Case–Shiller index, which was acquired by Fiserv in 2002. Weiss is also co-founder and CEO of Valshield Inc. He is on the board and advises several real estate investment companies focussing on single family and multi-family properties.

Weiss' business and research interests encompass home price analytics and related financial products. Recently his research has focused on forecasting home prices using granular and machine learning techniques. His interest in home finance products has included macro level investment and hedging techniques made available through macro securities (patents) and home equity insurance (paper). More recently he has focused on diversification through indexed fractional ownership (patents).

He is frequently interviewed by media outlets such as the Wall Street Journal, Bloomberg, the Washington Post and CNBC. Weiss' approaches for addressing homeowner and other financial risks have been published in a series of co-authored papers and cited by John Y. Campbell, Frank J. Fabozzi, Time magazine and national news columnists.

== Early life and education ==
Allan Weiss was born in Nyack, New York, the son of Marvin Weiss, an electro-optical engineer and entrepreneur and Janet Weiss (née Jaller) a media producer. Weiss received his B.A. in computer science and physics from Brandeis University and his MA in public and private management from Yale University.

== Career ==
He co-founded Case Shiller Weiss (CSW) in 1991 to increase market awareness of ongoing price changes in residential real estate. CSW used the new indexing technique from a highly regarded academic paper to create the S&P Case-Shiller index. Following this creation, CSW published forecasts of the Case-Shiller indexes in The Wall Street Journal for over five years.

In 1993 he co-authored a paper with Karl Case and Robert Shiller "Index-Based Futures and Options Markets in Real Estate", in The Journal of Portfolio Management. The paper defines and analyzes a method to hedge and invest in home prices. In 2004 Chicago Mercantile Exchange launched home price futures based on the Case-Shiller indexes.

In 1995 Weiss led the development of the CASA automated home valuation service.

In 1997, Weiss conceived of a new financial structure enabling equity market investors to hedge or invest in home prices and other economic indexes. Weiss named the structure the Proxy Asset Data Processor and along with Shiller received two US patents, 5987435 and 6513020, for these inventions. They founded Macro Securities to commercialize these inventions. Securities under these patents have traded on the American Stock Exchange (UOY and DOY) and the New York Stock Exchange (UMM and DMM).

A major uninsured home-ownership risk is the loss of home value due to market declines. In 1999 in collaboration with Robert Shiller, he published "Home Equity Insurance" in the Journal of Real Estate Finance and Economics to address this subject.

During sale of CSW to Fiserv, Weiss observed the extent to which smaller assets are worth less, for each dollar they earn, than larger more liquid assets; therefore liquid assets generate lower income per dollar invested. Owners of the smaller assets could benefit from higher prices if some of their cash flows were aggregated into a larger more liquid fund. Weiss patented Common Index Securities – US patents 7155468 and 7716106 – financing structures that generate liquid and therefore value enhanced investments by aggregating cash flows from smaller assets. This solution applies to any asset class whose value or earnings can be reliably indexed.

In 2007, Weiss founded Market Shield Capital to commercialize Market Shield funds and Market Shield Mortgage loans based on the structure called Common Index Securities that Weiss patented in 2006.

Weiss founded Weiss Analytics and is the CEO. WA aims to mitigate the financial risk of home ownership through 90 million repeat sales indexes, one for each house in the US, through the use of big data and parallel computing techniques. This approach presents home price dynamics at the house level or any user defined aggregation. Instead of arbitrary market definitions such as metro area, users can define their own markets such as "all houses with a current value above $500,000 within a 50-mile radius of the Statue of Liberty". This definition of new sub-markets leads to new insights.

== Writings ==
- "Moral Hazard and Home Equity Conversion" Real Estate Economics, Vol. 28, No. 1, 2000.[see CFDP 1177, CFP 1015]
- "Evaluating Real Estate Valuation Systems" Journal of Real Estate Finance and Economics, (1999) 18(2):147-61. [CFP 983]
- "Home Equity Insurance" Journal of Real Estate Finance and Economics, 19:1, 21–47, 1999. [see CFDP 1074, CFP 1007]
- "Mortgage Default Risk and Real Estate Prices: The Use of Index-Based Futures and Options in Real Estate" 1995, NBER Working Papers 5078, National Bureau of Economic Research, Inc.
- "Index-Based Futures and Options Markets in Real Estate" Journal of Portfolio Management (Winter 1993). [CFDP 1006]

== Patents ==
2013 "Indexed Based Liquidity System and Method", U.S. Patent #8,468,079 2013 "Indexed Payment Stream System and Method", U.S. Patent #8,346,654 2011 "Market-Indexed Mortgage System and Method", U.S. Patent #8,082,202 2010 "Common Index Securities", U.S. Patent #7,716,106 2006 "Common Index Securities", U.S. Patent #7,155,468 2003 "Proxy Asset Data Processor" (with Robert Shiller), U.S. Patent #6,513,020 1999 "Proxy Asset Data Processor" (with Robert Shiller), U.S. Patent #5,987,435
