= FNC Inc. =

FNC, Inc.
- Type: Subsidiary
- Industry: Property technology
- Founded: 1995; 31 years ago
- Founder: Bill Rayburn; Dennis Tosh; Robert Dorsey; John Johnson
- Headquarters: Oxford, Mississippi
- Number of employees: 300
- Parent: CoreLogic
- Website: www.fncinc.com

FNC, Inc., a subsidiary of CoreLogic, provides data to the real estate industry.

Its Collateral Management System (CMS) provides secure information regarding mortgage loans. FNC's ports, or web-based worksites, provide companies in various industries an efficient portal to exchange information with lenders and vendors. FNC operates four different ports: AppraisalPort, InspectionPort, TitlePort and DocuHarbor. CollateralDNA is a service that works to provide a full view of the mortgage collateral process.

== History ==
FNC was founded in 1995 by Bill Rayburn, Dennis Tosh, Robert Dorsey and John Johnson, then finance professors at the University of Mississippi and financial consultants, who recognized a need to manage collateral assets in mortgage transactions. It was funded by local investors.

The university also provided support for the company. In 1999, the company signed its first major client, Charter One Financial based in Cleveland, Ohio.

The original name of the company was Financial Neural Computing. The company's focus changed and the name was changed to FNC.

In 2008, FNC was on the list of fastest growing private companies by Inc.

From 2008 to 2019, FNC sponsored the Oxford-Lafayette Fields. During this sponsorship, the sports complex was renamed to "FNC Park".

In August 2009, the company announced integration with DartAppraisal.com.

In September 2010, FNC introduced its Residential Price Index, a benchmark for home values. It was based on data collected from public records blended with data from real-time appraisals of property and neighborhood attributes and the mortgage industry's first hedonic price index for residential properties. A hedonic approach is based on a holistic view of all the data available. It is constructed to gauge price movement among non-distressed home sales, and excludes sales of foreclosed properties.

In July 2012, the company partnered with Valued Veterans.

In November 2012, the company announced a partnership with CETIP, a Brazilian company, with plans to add 100 jobs. In March 2013, the company opened an office in Brazil.

In July 2013, FNC launched the FNC Clean Room, a web-based online marketplace for mortgage loans.

In December 2015, CoreLogic agreed to acquire the company for $475 million. The sale created 45 millionaires. The transaction was completed in 2016. At that time, the home value index was discontinued.

During the acquisition in 2016, the FNC Clean Room was spun off into a separate company called mTrade (Mortgage Trade).
