= Karl E. Case =

Karl Edwin "Chip" Case (November 5, 1946 – July 15, 2016) was professor of economics emeritus at Wellesley College in Wellesley, Massachusetts, United States, where he held the Coman and Hepburn Chair in Economics and taught for 34 years. He was a senior fellow at the Joint Center for Housing Studies at Harvard University and was president of the Boston Economic Club 2011-12. Case was also a founding partner in the real estate research firm of Fiserv Case Shiller Weiss, Inc., which created the S&P Case Shiller Index of home prices. He served as a member of the Board of Directors of the Depositors Insurance Fund of Massachusetts. He was a member of the Standard and Poor’s Index Advisory Committee, the academic advisory board of the Federal Reserve Bank of Boston and the board of advisors of the Rappaport Institute for Greater Boston at Harvard University. He served as a member of the boards of directors of the Mortgage Guaranty Insurance Corporation (MGIC), Century Bank, The Lincoln Institute of Land Policy, and the American Real Estate and Urban Economics Association. He was also an associate editor of The Journal of Economic Perspectives and The Journal of Economics Education.

== Life ==
Case received his B.A. from Miami University in 1968 and spent three years on active duty in the army including a tour in Vietnam. He received a Ph.D. in economics from Harvard University in 1977. At Harvard University, he served as head tutor (director of undergraduate studies) and won the Allyn Young Teaching Prize.

His research was in the areas of real estate, housing, and public finance. He is the author of numerous articles and studies on boom and bust real estate cycles, and is author or co-author of five books including Principles of Economics (1986), Economics and Tax Policy (1986) and Property Taxation: The Need for Reform (1978). Principles of Economics, a basic economics text co-authored with Ray C. Fair and Sharon Oster, first published in 1989, is in its ninth edition and is used at more than 500 colleges and universities.

Case’s research on housing markets and prices began with a New England Economic Review article published in 1986 entitled “The Market for Single Family Homes in Boston: 1979-1985.” In that paper Professor Case constructed a crude “repeat sales” index to isolate appreciation from mix effects in measuring changes in house values. The model presented in that paper showed that fundamentals explained only a small part of home price movements in the Northeast between 1979 and 1985. The paper conjectured that the region had experienced a home price bubble.

In 1985, Case met Yale University economist Robert Shiller, and they started out on a joint venture that would lead to over a dozen coauthored papers and essays. The earliest work by Case and Shiller (Case and Shiller 1987, 1989) included a methodological paper detailing a more refined version of the repeat sales price index and their most cited work, “The Efficiency of the Market for Single Family Homes”, which appeared in the American Economic Review in 1989. The latter paper presented weak form efficiency tests and found strong evidence of inertia in house prices. It also showed that over the cycle, simple decision rules would with near certainty bring excess profits. This was the first empirical paper on housing bubbles.

In 1991 they started a firm called Case Shiller Weiss Inc. with Allan Weiss who served as the CEO from inception to the Fiserv sale. They began producing the Case Shiller Index on a regular basis, now a well known and often cited index of house prices. The indexes are available at the ZIP code level in more than 90 Metro areas. Case Shiller Weiss was acquired by Fiserv in 2003, which continues to produce the indexes. The indexes for 20 of the metropolitan areas are licensed to Standard and Poor’s, which releases the Case-Shiller index on a monthly basis.

Following up on earlier research, Case and Shiller published an article in the Journal of the American Real Estate and Urban Economics Association (Case and Shiller 1990), which presented strong form tests showing the housing market was forecastable. In 1988, they responded to a booming housing market in California by developing a survey of the expectations and attitudes of homebuyers in four cities: San Francisco, Anaheim (Orange County, CA), Milwaukee, and Boston. The survey showed that home buyers were knowledgeable about current conditions, they saw little or no risk in the housing market, they had very positive price expectations, they thought of housing as an investment, and they indicated they would hold out in a down market. In 2003, Case and Shiller redid the same survey and have repeated it every year since. Case, Shiller and Weiss also wrote a series of articles which proposed the establishment of futures and options markets in real estate (Case, Shiller and Weiss 1993).

Case wrote several papers which described the consequences of housing price booms and busts for regional economies and the distribution of income and wealth (Case and Cook 1989; Case 1990,1991, and 1992).

The debate continues about who anticipated the ultimate collapse of the housing market. Case and Shiller were among the first to describe the risks. They were writing about housing bubbles in regional markets in the mid 1980s. The question they were investigating was how do housing price booms unwind? Do they gradually deflate or do they burst?

In 1999, Professor Case wrote a paper for the Brookings Panel entitled “Real Estate and the Macroeconomy.” The topic was suggested by William Brainard of The Brookings Institution who was very worried about the risks posed by a house price bubble. In that paper Case wrote:

In the current economic climate, with home prices rising in every region of the country, variations in borrower characteristics such as credit scores explain most of the variation in default and foreclosure. If the housing market were to suffer a 20 percent decline, default rates and losses would far exceed the losses forecast by the most sophisticated credit scoring models in the industry.

In more recent years, Case has published papers on the wealth effect of home price increases with Robert Shiller and John Quigley at the University of California, Berkeley.

Case died July 15, 2016, following an illness.
