= Housing bubble =

Real-estate bubble involving housing

A housing bubble (or housing price bubble) is one of several types of asset price bubbles which periodically occur in the market. The basic concept of a housing bubble is the same as for other asset bubbles, consisting of two main phases. First there is a period where house prices increase dramatically, driven by real estate investing. In the second phase, house prices fall dramatically, making housing more affordable. Housing bubbles tend to be among the asset bubbles with the largest effect on the real economy because they are credit-fueled, and a large number of households participate and not just investors, and because the wealth effect from housing tends to be larger than for other types of financial assets.

== Housing bubble definition ==
Most research papers on housing bubbles use standard asset price definitions. There are many definitions of bubbles. Most of them are normative definitions, like that of Joseph Stiglitz (1990), that try to describe bubbles as periods involving speculation, or argue that bubbles involve prices that cannot be justified by fundamentals. Examples are Palgrave (1926), Flood and Hodrick (1990), Robert J. Shiller (2005), Smith and Smith (2006) and Cochrane (2010).

Stiglitz's definition is: "...the basic intuition is straightforward: if the reason that the price is high today is only because investors believe that the selling price will be high tomorrow—when ‘fundamental' factors do not seem to justify such a price—then a bubble exists." (Stiglitz 1990, p. 13)

Lind (2009) argued that we needed a new definition of price bubbles in the housing market, an "anti-Stiglitz" definition. His point is that traditional definitions such as that of Stiglitz (1990), in which bubbles are proposed as arising from prices not being determined by fundamentals, are problematic. This is primarily because the concept "fundamentals" is vague, but also because these types of nominal definitions typically do not refer to a bubble episode as a whole—with both an increase and a decrease of the price. Lind claims that the solution is to define a bubble by focusing only on the specific development of prices and not on why prices have developed in a certain way. The general definition of a bubble would then simply be: "There is a bubble if the (real) price of an asset first increases dramatically over a period of several months or years and then almost immediately falls dramatically." (Lind 2009, p. 80)

Inspired by Lind (2009), Oust and Hrafnkelsson (2017) created the following housing bubble definition: "A large housing price bubble has a dramatic increase in real prices, at least 50% during a five-year period or 35% during a three-year period, followed by an immediate dramatic fall in the prices of at least 35%. A small bubble has a dramatic increase in real prices, at least 35% during a five-year period or 20% during a three-year period, followed by an immediate dramatic fall in the prices of at least 20%."

== Identifying housing bubbles ==
=== Housing bubbles vs. overpricing in the housing market ===
Overpricing can be said to be a necessary, but insufficient indicator that a bubble exists. Overpricing is defined more widely than a bubble. An asset may be overpriced without there being a bubble, but you cannot have a (positive) bubble without overpricing. Over- or underpricing may simply be defined as a deviation from the equilibrium price. DiPasquale and Wheaton (1994) say that: "Indeed, it appears to be normal for housing prices to deviate from the fundamental value or equilibrium price, since housing markets clear gradually rather than quickly in a short run."

Mayer (2011) investigated house price bubbles and found that there are basically three approaches researchers take when investigating house price differ from equilibrium.

First, there is the finance-based method, where the house price equals the discounted future rents. This follows the same logic when performing a stock valuation; the stock price is equal to the discounted sum of all future dividends. The idea is that the value of equity is equal to the discounted dividends. Price rent ratio and user cost of housing are methods that fall under this method.

The second approach is to compare the costs of building new dwellings against the actual house prices today. Much of the construction cost method has its basis in the demand and supply curve theory. If demand is low, this leads to lower house prices and less construction of new homes. Glaeser and Gyourko (2005) point out that the housing market is characterized by a kinked supply curve that is highly elastic when prices are at or above construction costs. Otherwise, the supply curve is highly inelastic. Housing can be built rather quickly, but since housing is a durable good, old housing does not disappear quickly. Thus, house prices in slow or negative demand growth markets are capped by construction costs. Price construction cost ratio and price building cost ratio are methods that is falls in under this method.

The last approach by Mayer (2011) is to utilize a combination of house price affordability to derive an equilibrium model. Often house prices are compared to income (income is used as proxy variable for affordability). If house prices are too high, households cannot afford the same level of housing services (affordability). Symmetrically, when house prices are low, households may afford a higher level of housing services. Price income ratio, price wage ratio, price household income ratio are examples of this method. There also exist a set of different housing affordability indices that looks at the development in interest payments to income or the cost of the mortgage to income. In addition to using house price equilibrium based on economic measures, there are also possible to use statistical techniques to identifying the long-term price trend, for example HP-filter.

=== Shiller's bubble checklist (2010) ===
1. Sharp increases in the price of an asset like real estate or shares
2. Great public excitement about said increases
3. An accompanying media frenzy
4. Stories of people earning much money, causing envy among people who are not
5. Growing interest in asset class among the general public
6. "New era" theories to justify unprecedented price increases
7. A decline in lending standards

=== Lind's housing bubble indicator groups (2009) ===
1. Interest payments in relation to income for homebuyers
  1. Nominal interest payments in relation to income have been increasing.
  2. Nominal interest payment in relation to income would have been increasing if historical interest rate levels were applied.
  3. Real interest payments in relation to income have been increasing.
  4. Real interest payments in relation to income would have been increasing if historical interest rate levels were applied.
2. Housing supply
  1. The easier it is to increase supply, the more likely is the increased price a part of a bubble
3. Buyer expectations about prices
  1. Buyers expect prices to continue to rise or to stabilize on a level that is much higher than historical trends.
  2. Buyers believe that even in a median term perspective (three to five years) investing in housing is almost risk‐free.
4. Buyers risk‐taking and impatience
  1. People are entering ownership at an earlier age or at a higher quality level.
  2. Buyers tend to choose riskier financing alternatives than earlier.
  3. Buyers are amortizing less than earlier.
5. Bank behavior
6. Banks are increasing or at least not decreasing loan to value ratios for buyers on the housing market when prices increase.
  1. Banks become more liberal when judging the credit worthiness of households.
7. Speculative behavior
  1. A larger share of home‐buyers than usual are planning to sell rather quickly again.

=== Other housing bubble indicators ===
- Housing prices vs. vacancy rate. A large number of vacancies will have a downward pressure on prices, since in this case; supply exceeds demand (Geltner, Miller, Clayton, & Eichholtz, 2007). Alternatively the opposite: occupancy rate.
- Real housing prices vs. demography. If there is a net inflow of tenants the cost of dwelling can be expected to increase (Englund, 2011).
- Housing prices vs. GDP can be used if data on income is unavailable, since changes in GDP and income can be expected to correlate (Claussen, Jonsson, & Lagerwall, 2011).
- The loan to value ratio (LTV) is a good indicator for the risk involved for the lender as well as for the borrower. The higher the ratio the higher is the risk (Kokko, 1999).
- The debt service ratio or debt coverage ratio (DSCR), i.e. the ratio of funds available for the payment of interest and principal. This is considered a good indicator for the level of risk involved (Joshi, 2006).
- The ratio between loan and disposable income should not change over time. An increase above the long term average indicates that the market may be overvalued (Finocchinaro, Nilsson, Nyberg, & Soultanaeva, 2011).
- Housing prices vs. interest rates. If interest rates increase it will be more expensive to own a piece of real estate and to compensate for the higher user cost it can be expected that the price will drop. (Englund, 2011).
- High and increasing house price growth. Oust and Hrafnkelsson (2017)

== Historical housing bubbles ==
=== Large housing bubbles in OECD countries 1970–2015 ===
					Price change prior to/after peak	Price change prior to/after peak	Price change prior to/after peak	Price change prior to/after peak	Price change prior to/after peak
Country	Price	Peaks/troughs	Duration (Quarters)	Aggregated	Aggregated 5 year	An. 5Y average	Aggregated 3 year	An. 3Y average	1 year
Finland	Increase	1989-Q2	15	68.3%	63.3%	12.7%	65.8%	21.9%	24.1%
Finland	Fall	1995-Q4	26	-50.5%	-46.0%	-9.2%	41.0%	-13.7%	-11.9%
Ireland	Increase	2007-Q1	56	235.6%	52.9%	10.6%	30.5%	10.2%	10.1%
Ireland	Fall	2013-Q1	24	-53.6%	-51.6%	-10.3%	-31.8%	-10.6%	-7.1%
Netherlands	Increase	1978-Q2	33	138.9%	94.4%	18.9%	69.0%	23.0%	6.5%
Netherlands	Fall	1985-Q3	29	-52.6%	-47.9%	-9.6%	-35.5%	-11.8%	-11.8%
New Zealand	Increase	1974-Q3	18	66.2%	*66.2 %	14.7%	64.4%	21.5%	29.9%
New Zealand	Fall	1980-Q4	25	-39.4%	-34.7%	-6.9%	-22.7%	-7.6%	-9.2%
Norway	Increase	1987-Q1	8	44.0%	37.8%	7.6%	39.8%	13.3%	25.0%
Norway	Fall	1993-Q1	24	-45.5%	-41.2%	-8.2%	-28.6%	-9.5%	-2.3%
South Africa	Increase	1984-Q1	21	55.1%	54.9%	11.0%	25.5%	8.5%	9.2%
South Africa	Fall	1987-Q1	12	-44.1%	-42.8%	-8.6%	-44.1%	-14.7%	-18.1%
Spain	Increase	2007-Q2	41	138.8%	69.2%	13.8%	30.1%	10.0%	9.0%
Spain	Fall	2014-Q1	27	-45.5%	-36.0%	-7.2%	-14.1%	-4.7%	-4.5%
UK	Increase	1973-Q3	14	67.4%	*67.4 %	19.3%	66.2%	22.1%	23.5%
UK	Fall	1977-Q3	16	-35.6%	-29.3%	-5.9%	-28.9%	-9.6%	-11.2%
USA	Increase	2006-Q1	38	92.9%	54.1%	10.8%	35.4%	11.8%	7.8%
USA	Fall	2011-Q4	23	-39.6%	-37.1%	-7.4%	-33.0%	-11.0%	-4.3%

The table is from Oust and Hrafnkelsson (2017) and has been constructed using their bubble definition. The dataset consists of quarterly real prices for 20 OECD countries from 1970 to 2015. Duration is the number of quarters since the last turning point (or from the start of the data series). Aggregated price change is the aggregate price change for the duration. *The aggregated price change is from the start of the period to the peak.

=== Small housing bubbles in OECD countries 1970–2015 ===
					Price change prior to/after peak	Price change prior to/after peak	Price change prior to/after peak	Price change prior to/after peak	Price change prior to/after peak
Country	Price	Peaks/troughs	Duration	Aggregated	Aggregated 5 year	An. 5Y average	Aggregated 3 year	An. 3Y average	1 year
Belgium	Increase	1979-Q3	31	59.6%	33.4%	6.7%	21.2%	7.1%	3.9%
Belgium	Fall	1985-Q2	23	-40.4%	-36.8%	-7.4%	-26.5%	-8.8%	-7.1%
Denmark	Increase	1986-Q2	14	55.8%	29.9%	6.0%	31.5%	10.5%	14.0%
Denmark	Fall	1993-Q2	28	-36.5%	-29.4%	-5.9%	-19.2%	-6.4%	-12.5%
Denmark	Increase	2006-Q3	53	180.1%	63.9%	12.8%	60.0%	20.0%	21.1%
Denmark	Fall	2012-Q4	25	-28.5%	-25.0%	-5.0%	-21.1%	-7.0%	-0.7%
Finland	Increase	1974-Q2	10	28.8%	*27.9 %	6.6%	28.5%	9.5%	6.8%
Finland	Fall	1979-Q3	21	-34.0%	-33.8%	-6.8%	-26.6%	-8.9%	-13.5%
Ireland	Increase	1980-Q4	43	44.3%	44.3%	8.9%	29.2%	9.7%	5.8%
Ireland	Fall	1987-Q2	26	-35.3%	-29.0%	-5.8%	-25.7%	-8.6%	-7.0%
Italy	Increase	1981-Q2	13	40.6%	26.8%	5.4%	36.5%	12.2%	19.2%
Italy	Fall	1986-Q4	22	-27.8%	-27.6%	-5.5%	-18.5%	-6.2%	-4.8%
Japan	Increase	1973-Q4	15	60.9%	*60.9 %	16.2%	47.5%	15.8%	17.0%
Japan	Fall	1977-Q3	15	-34.2%	-32.3%	-6.5%	-31.5%	-10.5%	-17.6%
Japan	Increase	1990-Q4	53	79.6%	37.6%	7.5%	22.9%	7.6%	9.7%
Japan	Fall	2009-Q2	74	-49.5%	-17.3%	-3.5%	-14.3%	-4.8%	-3.3%
Korea	Increase	1979-Q2	37	88.5%	88.5%	17.7%	72.3%	24.1%	5.4%
Korea	Fall	1982-Q2	12	-33.6%	-15.2%	-3.0%	-33.6%	-11.2%	-14.8%
Korea	Increase	1991-Q1	14	34.3%	27.0%	5.4%	25.7%	8.6%	8.1%
Korea	Fall	2001-Q1	40	-48.5%	-33.0%	-6.6%	-25.8%	-8.6%	-11.6%
Spain	Increase	1978-Q2	9	29.7%	40.6%	8.1%	24.1%	8.0%	12.2%
Spain	Fall	1982-Q4	18	-36.7%	-30.8%	-6.2%	-25.9%	-8.6%	-10.4%
Spain	Increase	1991-Q4	36	142.3%	102.4%	20.5%	34.2%	11.4%	10.9%
Spain	Fall	1997-Q1	21	-21.2%	-21.0%	-4.2%	-18.7%	-6.2%	-12.5%
Sweden	Increase	1990-Q1	17	46.6%	42.5%	8.5%	35.9%	12.0%	8.8%
Sweden	Fall	1995-Q4	23	-31.9%	-30.0%	-6.0%	-28.4%	-9.5%	-1.6%
Switzerland	Increase	1973-Q1	12	27.7%	*27.7 %	9.2%	27.7%	9.2%	17.7%
Switzerland	Fall	1976-Q3	14	-28.4%	-26.6%	-5.3%	-27.8%	-9.3%	-10.6%
Switzerland	Increase	1989-Q4	53	72.1%	38.1%	7.6%	28.7%	9.6%	4.6%
Switzerland	Fall	2000-Q1	41	-38.6%	-27.6%	-5.5%	-21.6%	-7.2%	-8.0%
UK	Increase	1989-Q3	30	103.6%	77.8%	15.6%	58.1%	19.4%	10.6%
UK	Fall	1995-Q4	25	-29.3%	-26.6%	-5.3%	-24.7%	-8.2%	-9.4%

The table is from Oust and Hrafnkelsson (2017) and has been constructed using their bubble definition. The dataset consists of quarterly real prices for 20 OECD countries from 1970 to 2015. Duration is the number of quarters since the last turning point (or from the start of the data series). Aggregated price change is the aggregate price change for the duration. * The aggregated price change is from the start of the period to the peak.

== By country ==
- Australian property bubble – ongoing currently
- Russian residential real estate 2020–2022 bubble — ongoing currently.
- Baltic states housing bubble
- British property bubble
- Canadian property bubble - ongoing currently
- Chinese property bubble – 2005–2011
- Danish property bubble – 2001–2006
- Irish property bubble – 1999–2006
- Japanese asset price bubble – 1986–1991
- Lebanese housing bubble
- New Zealand property bubble – ongoing currently
- Polish property bubble – 2002–2008
- Romanian property bubble
- Spanish property bubble – 1985–2008
- United States housing bubble – 1997–2006

== See also ==
- Cost-of-living crisis
- Housing crisis
- Real estate development
- Right to housing
