= Housing affordability in anglophone countries =

Housing markets in English-speaking countries

The 16th Annual Demographia International Housing Affordability Survey: 2020 analyzed housing affordability in seven Anglophone countries and Hong Kong. Among this sample, the housing markets with the least affordable real estate prices are Hong Kong, Vancouver, and Sydney.

The top three housing markets with the most affordable real estate prices based on major housing markets are Rochester, New York, Cleveland, Ohio, and Oklahoma City, Oklahoma. This survey was performed by Demographia, a global analysis firm.

== Methodology ==
The prices are based on data from the third quarter of 2019. The housing markets ranked are located in Australia, Canada, Hong Kong, Ireland, New Zealand, Singapore, United Kingdom, and the United States. The report also includes special coverage on Russia.

The housing markets are ranked on middle income housing affordability, which uses the "median multiple". This was calculated by taking the median house price divided by the median gross pre-tax household income of the housing market. The median multiple is used widely for analyzing housing markets and is recommended by the World Bank and the United Nations. It has also been used by the Joint Center for Housing Studies at Harvard University.

Demographia uses housing affordability ratings to categorize each housing market's median multiple.

Demographia housing affordability ratings
| Housing affordability rating | Median multiple |
|---|---|
| Affordable | 3.0 and under |
| Moderately unaffordable | 3.1 to 4.0 |
| Seriously unaffordable | 4.1 to 5.0 |
| Severely unaffordable | 5.1 and over |

== List ==
The report is split into two rankings, one for major housing markets, and one for all housing markets. The list below shows the rankings from the most unaffordable housing market to the most affordable housing market for the major housing markets. The list contains 92 housing markets.

| Rank (3rd quarter 2019) | Housing market | Country/territory | Median multiple |
|---|---|---|---|
| 1 | Hong Kong | Hong Kong | 20.8 |
| 2 | Vancouver | Canada | 11.9 |
| 3 | Sydney | Australia | 11.0 |
| 4 | Melbourne | Australia | 9.5 |
| 5 | Los Angeles | United States | 9.0 |
| 6 | Toronto | Canada | 8.6 |
| 6 | Auckland | New Zealand | 8.6 |
| 8 | San Jose, California | United States | 8.5 |
| 9 | San Francisco | United States | 8.4 |
| 10 | London (Greater London Authority) | United Kingdom | 8.2 |
| 11 | Honolulu | United States | 8.0 |
| 12 | San Diego | United States | 7.3 |
| 13 | Bournemouth and Dorset | United Kingdom | 6.9 |
| 13 | Adelaide | Australia | 6.9 |
| 15 | London Exurbs (east and southeast England) | United Kingdom | 6.6 |
| 16 | Bristol and Bath | United Kingdom | 6.5 |
| 17 | Brisbane | Australia | 6.3 |
| 18 | Plymouth and Devon | United Kingdom | 6.0 |
| 18 | Perth | Australia | 6.0 |
| 20 | Swindon and Wiltshire | United Kingdom | 5.8 |
| 21 | Northampton and Northamptonshire | United Kingdom | 5.7 |
| 22 | Seattle | United States | 5.5 |
| 23 | Riverside-San Bernardino | United States | 5.4 |
| 23 | New York metropolitan area | United States | 5.4 |
| 23 | Miami | United States | 5.4 |
| 23 | Leicester and Leicestershire | United Kingdom | 5.4 |
| 27 | Denver | United States | 5.3 |
| 27 | Greater Boston | United States | 5.3 |
| 29 | Sacramento, California | United States | 5.2 |
| 29 | Fresno, California | United States | 5.2 |
| 31 | Portland metropolitan area | United States | 5.1 |
| 32 | Las Vegas | United States | 5.0 |
| 32 | Birmingham and West Midlands | United Kingdom | 5.0 |
| 34 | Montreal | Canada | 4.7 |
| 34 | Middlesbrough and Durham, England | United Kingdom | 4.7 |
| 34 | Dublin | Ireland | 4.7 |
| 37 | Singapore | Singapore | 4.6 |
| 37 | Salt Lake City | United States | 4.6 |
| 37 | Manchester and Greater Manchester | United Kingdom | 4.6 |
| 37 | Hull and Humber | United Kingdom | 4.6 |
| 41 | Nottingham and Nottinghamshire | United Kingdom | 4.5 |
| 41 | Newcastle upon Tyne and Tyneside | United Kingdom | 4.5 |
| 43 | Stoke-on-Trent and Staffordshire | United Kingdom | 4.4 |
| 43 | Providence metropolitan area | United States | 4.4 |
| 43 | Orlando | United States | 4.4 |
| 46 | New Orleans | United States | 4.3 |
| 46 | Derby and Derbyshire | United Kingdom | 4.3 |
| 48 | Phoenix, Arizona | United States | 4.2 |
| 48 | Leeds and West Yorkshire | United Kingdom | 4.2 |
| 50 | Tucson, Arizona | United States | 4.1 |
| 50 | Tampa Bay area | United States | 4.1 |
| 50 | Ottawa-Gatineau | Canada | 4.1 |

== See also ==
- Real estate
- Affordable housing
- House price index
- Housing affordability index
- English-speaking world
