= Cost-of-living index =

Economic price index

A cost-of-living index is a theoretical price index that measures relative cost of living over time or regions. It is an index that measures differences in the price of goods and services, and allows for substitutions with other items as prices vary.

There are many different methods that have been developed to approximate the cost of living index. A Konüs index is a type of cost-of-living index that uses an expenditure function such as one used in assessing expected compensating variation. The expected indirect utility is equated in both periods.

== Application to price index theory ==
The United States Consumer Price Index (CPI) is a price index that is based on the idea of a cost-of-living index. The U.S. Department of Labor's Bureau of Labor Statistics (BLS) explains the differences:

The CPI frequently is called a cost-of-living index, but it differs in important ways from a complete cost-of-living measure. BLS has for some time used a cost-of-living framework in making practical decisions about questions that arise in constructing the CPI. A cost-of-living index is a conceptual measurement goal, however, not a straightforward alternative to the CPI. A cost-of-living index would measure changes over time in the amount that consumers need to spend to reach a certain utility level or standard of living. Both the CPI and a cost-of-living index would reflect changes in the prices of goods and services, such as food and clothing that are directly purchased in the marketplace; but a complete cost-of-living index would go beyond this to also take into account changes in other governmental or environmental factors that affect consumers' well-being. It is very difficult to determine the proper treatment of public goods, such as safety and education, and other broad concerns, such as health, water quality, and crime that would constitute a complete cost-of-living framework.

== Economic theory ==
The basis for the theory behind the cost-of-living index is attributed to Russian economist A. A. Konüs. The theory assumes that consumers are optimizers and get as much utility as possible from the money that they have to spend. These assumptions can be shown to lead to a "consumer's cost function", C(u,p), the cost of achieving utility level u given a set of prices p. Assuming that the cost function holds across time (i.e., people get the same amount of utility from one set of purchases in year as they would have buying the same set in a different year) leads to a "true cost of living index". The general form for Konüs's true cost-of-living index compares the consumer's cost function given the prices in one year with the consumer's cost function given the prices in a different year:

$$P_K(p^0,p^1,u)=\frac{C(u,p^1)}{ C(u,p^0)}$$

Since u can be defined as the utility received from a set of goods measured in quantity, q, u can be replaced with f(q) to produce a version of the true cost of living index that is based on price and quantities like most other price indices:

$P_K(p^0,p^1,q)=\frac{C(f(q),p^1)}{ C(f(q),p^0)}$

In simpler terms, the true cost-of-living index is the cost of achieving a certain level of utility (or standard of living) in one year relative to the cost of achieving the same level the next year.

Utility is not directly measurable, so the true cost of living index serves only as a theoretical ideal, not a practical price index formula. However, more practical formulas can be evaluated based on their relationship to the true cost of living index. One of the most commonly used formulas for consumer price indices, the Laspeyres price index, compares the cost of what a consumer bought in one time period (q^{0}) with how much it would have cost to buy the same set of goods and services in a later period. Since the utility from q^{0} in the first year should be equal to the utility from q^{0} in the next year, Laspeyres gives the upper bound for the true cost-of-living index. Laspeyres only serves as an upper bound, because consumers could turn to substitute goods for those goods that have gotten more expensive and achieved the same level of utility from q^{0} for a lower cost. In contrast, a Paasche price index uses the cost of a set of goods purchased in one time period with the cost it would have taken to buy the same set of goods in an earlier time period. It can be shown that the Paasche is a lower bound for true cost of living index. Since upper and lower bounds of the true cost of living index can be found, respectively, through the Laspeyres and Paasche indices, the geometric average of the two, known as the Fisher price index, is a close approximation of the true cost of living index if the upper and lower bounds are not too far apart.

== See also ==
- ACCRA Cost of Living Index
- Bureau of Labor Statistics
- Consumer price index
- Cost-of-living crisis
- Median house price to income ratio
- Housing affordability index
- Inflation
- Inflation hedge
