= ACCRA Cost of Living Index =

Cost of living index for the United States

The Cost of Living Index (COLI), formerly the ACCRA Cost of Living Index is a measure of living cost differences among urban areas in the United States compiled by the Council for Community and Economic Research. First published in 1968, the index compares the price of goods and services among metro areas across the US. The index is widely used by economists, researchers and corporations to measure relative cost of living.
