= Asset price inflation =

Rise in the value of financial and capital assets

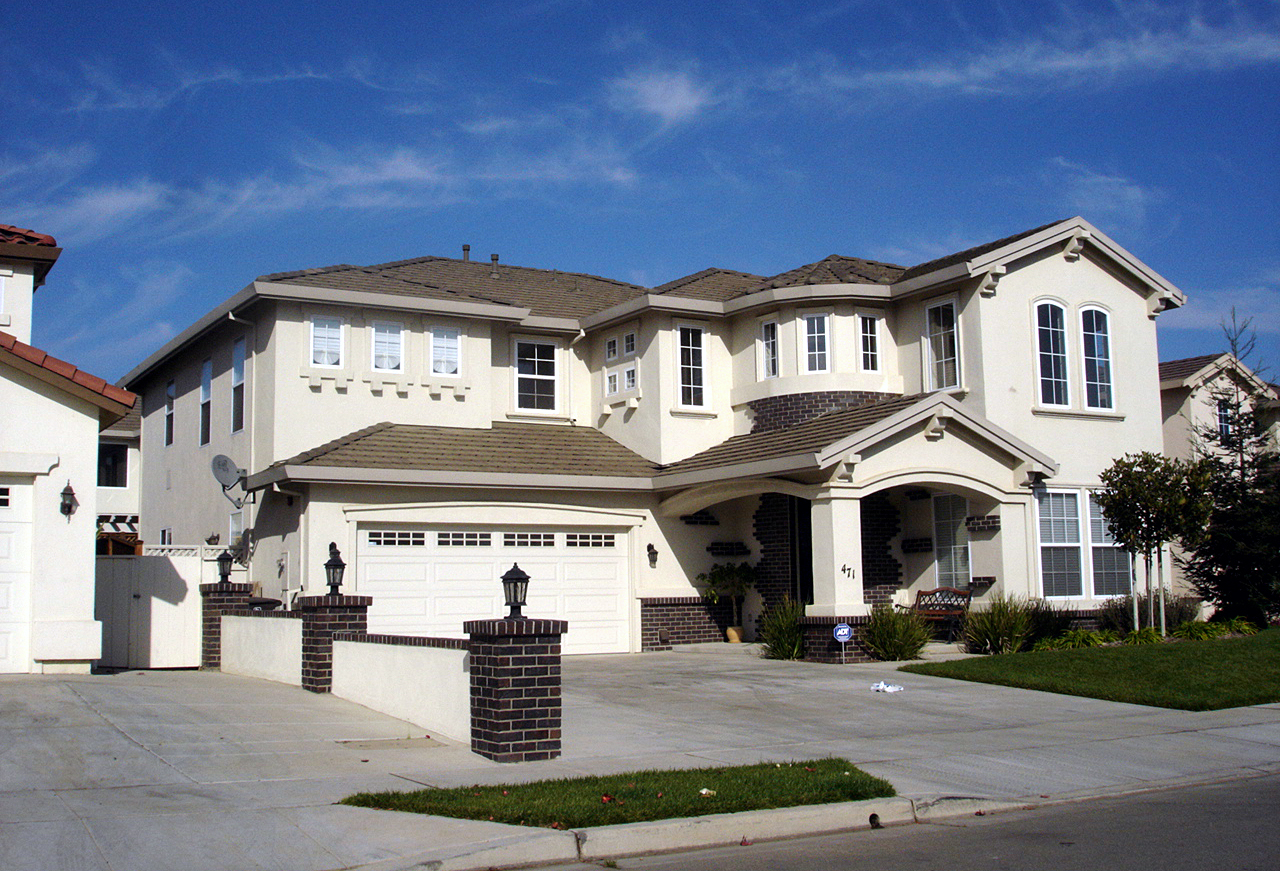
The U.S. housing bubble is one example of asset price inflation.

Asset price inflation is the economic phenomenon whereby the price of assets rises and becomes inflated. A common reason for higher asset prices is low interest rates. When interest rates are low, investors and savers cannot make easy returns using low-risk methods such as government bonds or savings accounts. To still get a return on their money, investors instead have to buy up other assets such as stocks and real estate, thereby bidding up the price and creating asset price inflation.

When people talk about inflation, they usually refer to ordinary goods and services, which are tracked by the Consumer Price Index (CPI). This index excludes most financial assets and capital assets. Inflation of such assets should not be confused with inflation of consumer goods and services, as prices in the two categories are not directly correlated. The prices of some goods and services, such as housing, energy, and food, do track closely with some financial assets.

The primary beneficiaries of rising asset prices are usually those who earn the highest wages or salaries, since the tendency to save and to invest is higher.

Examples of typical assets are shares and bonds (and their related contracts), as well as real estate, gold and other capital goods. They can also include alternative investment assets such as fine art, luxury watches, cryptocurrency, and venture capital.

== Price inflation vis-à-vis asset inflation ==
As inflation is generally understood and perceived as the rise in price of 'ordinary' goods and services, and official and central bank policies in most of today’s world have been expressly directed at minimizing 'price inflation', asset inflation has not been the object of much attention or concern. An example of this is the housing market, which concerns almost every individual household, where house prices have, over the past 25 years, consistently risen by or at least near a two-digit percentage, far above that of the Consumer Price Index.

There is no observable cause-and-effect relationship between asset price inflation and consumer price inflation. Some studies have shown that housing and real estate prices could be leading indicators of consumer price inflation.

== Possible causes ==
Some political economists believe that asset inflation has been, either by default or by design, the outcome of purposive policies pursued by central banks and political decision-makers to combat and reduce the much more visible price inflation, The most important concept behind inflation is purchasing power. Purchasing power refers to how much you can buy with your money. Inflation reduces purchasing power, even if the number in your savings account stays the same. This could be for a variety of reasons, some overt, but others more concealed or even disreputable. Some think that it is the consequence of a natural reaction of investors to the danger of shrinking value of practically all important currencies, which, as in 2012, e.g., seems to them highly probable due to the tremendous worldwide growth of the mass of money. Their preference for real goods pushes their price up without any purposive policies from decision-makers.

== Possible results ==
Asset price inflation has often been followed by an asset price crash. This can happen in a sudden and sometimes unexpected fall in the price of a particular asset class. Examples of asset price crashes include Dutch tulips in the 17th century, Japanese metropolitan real estate and stocks in the early 1990s, and internet stocks in 2001. A more recent example is that of the 2007 subprime mortgage financial crisis. However, if the money supply has the potential to induce heavy general inflation (all major currencies in 2011/2012), none of these crashes may happen.

== See also ==
- Economic bubble
- Inflationism
- Inflation hedge
