= Housing affordability index =

Adjusted house price measure

A housing affordability index (HAI) is an index that measures housing affordability, usually the degree to which the median person or family in a particular country or region can afford housing/housing-related costs.

Housing affordability is one contribution to the cost of living in an area; measured by the cost-of-living index.

== By region ==
The OECD has published data on housing prices around the world, which includes housing rent prices indices, real and nominal house prices indices, and ratios of price to rent and price to income.

=== Australia ===
In Australia, the Housing Industry Association publishes a Housing Affordability Index, which is a "'purchase affordability' metric which is most representative of an individual owner occupier purchasing a home with a mortgage, although it is also indicative of conditions for others transacting in the housing market." In this context, the HIA defines affordability in accordance with the premise that "housing costs become excessive should they exceed more than 30% of their income."

=== Canada ===
The Bank of Canada has published its Housing Affordability Index since 1983. This HAI is "meant to measure the share of disposable income that a representative household would put toward housing-related expenses," which includes mortgage payments and utility fees. The measure is a ratio of housing-related costs to average household disposable income; the higher the ratio, the more difficult it is to afford a home.

The National Bank of Canada publishes a Housing Affordability Monitor report, which "measures housing affordability in 10 major census metropolitan areas" (Calgary, Edmonton, Hamilton, Montreal, Ottawa–Gatineau, Quebec City, Toronto, Vancouver, Victoria, Winnipeg) and "summarizes the results in a weighted-average composite of the 10 CMAs." The report tracks the condominium market, other dwellings (single detached, semi-detached), and the market as a whole.

The Royal Bank of Canada (RBC) publishes a Housing Trends and Affordability report, which aggregates affordability measures.

Desjardins Group publishes the Desjardins Affordability Index (DAI), which "measures the ability of households to purchase a home and assume related costs," calculated for Canada as a whole, as well as for the provinces of Quebec and Ontario, for all CMAs of these two provinces, and for the cities of Calgary and Vancouver.

Statistics Canada publishes the New Housing Price Index (NHPI), a "monthly series that measures changes over time in the contractors' selling prices of new residential houses, where detailed specifications pertaining to each house remain the same between two consecutive periods." The NHPI is used by economists, academics, and the general public to monitor trends in the residential sector of the Canadian construction industry.

RE/MAX Canada also publishes a Housing Affordability Report.

=== European Union ===
In the European Union, the EU has also released data on housing affordability.

=== United Kingdom ===
The U.K. Office for National Statistics has published reports for housing affordability in England and Wales, using "annual data on house prices and annual earnings to calculate affordability ratios for national and subnational geographies" in those two countries.

=== United States ===
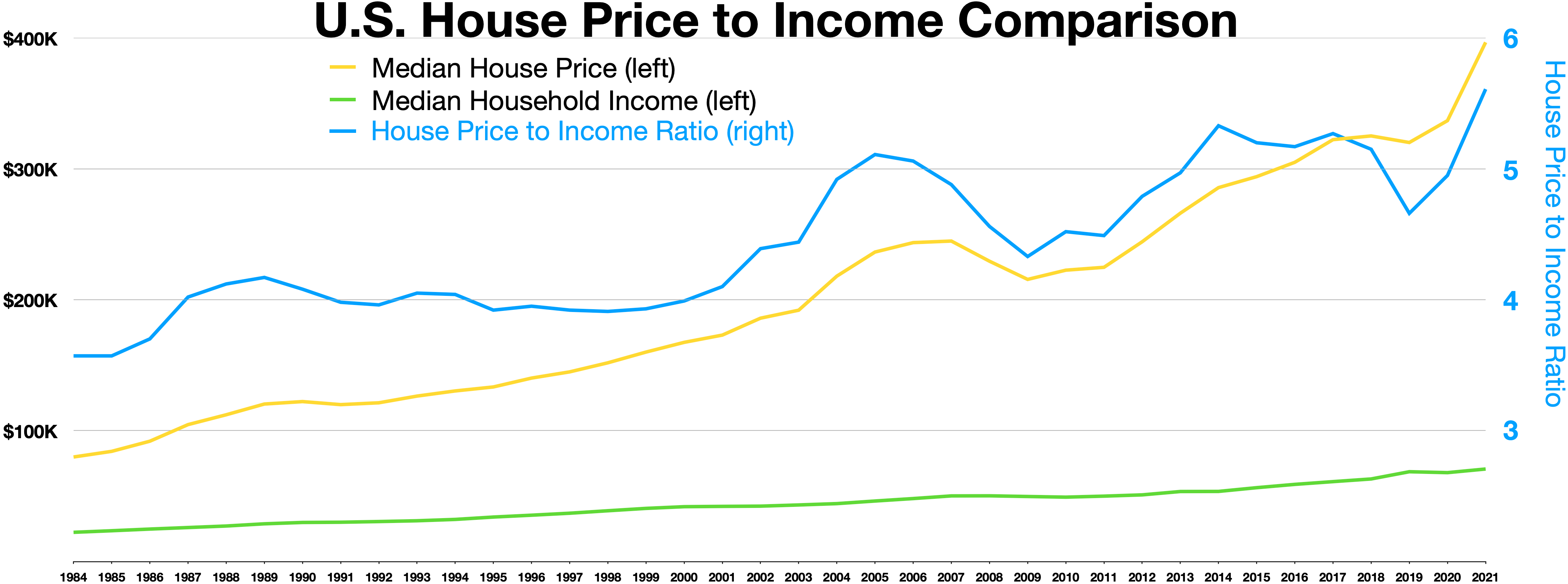
House price to income ratio Median house price (left) House price to income ratio (right) Median household income (left)

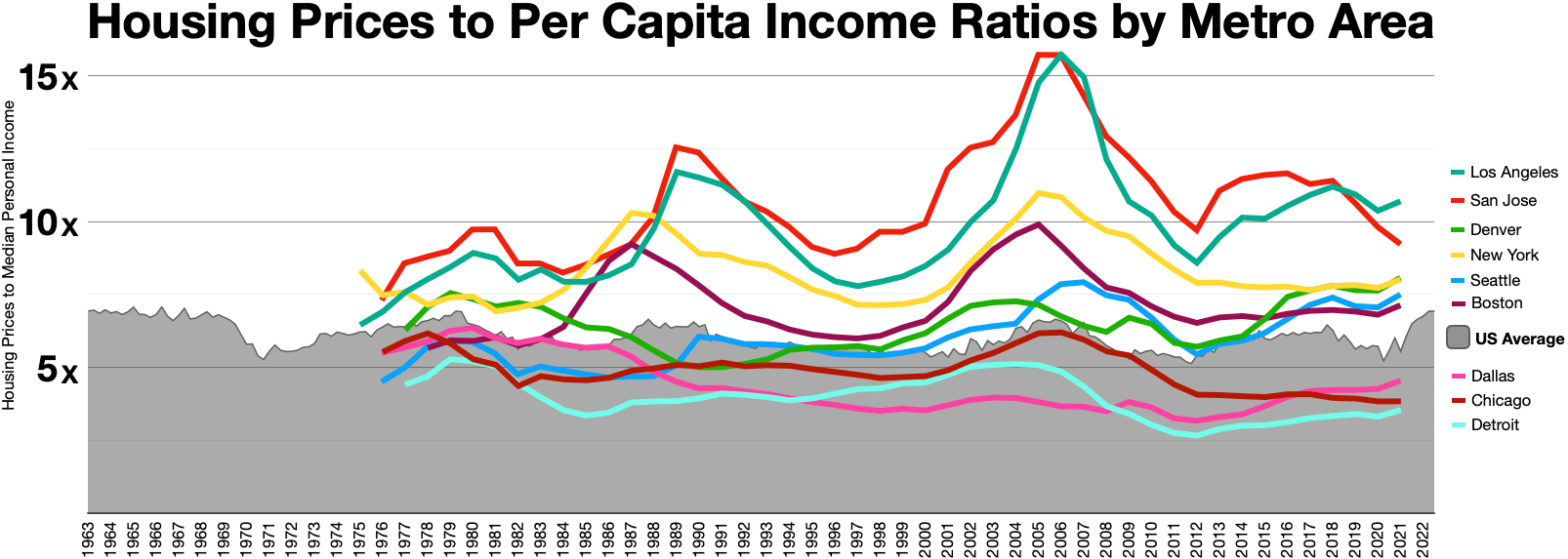
Housing prices to personal income (per capita) ratios by metro area Los Angeles San Jose Denver New York Seattle Boston United States average Dallas Chicago Detroit

The National Association of Realtors (NAR) publishes a monthly Housing Affordability Index which "measures whether or not a typical family earns enough income to qualify for a mortgage loan on a typical home at the national and regional levels based on the most recent price and income data."

A value of 100 means that a family with the median income has exactly enough income to qualify for a mortgage on a median-priced home. An index above 100 signifies that family earning the median income has more than enough income to qualify for a mortgage loan on a median-priced home, assuming a 20% down payment and a qualifying ratio of 25%.

For example, a composite HAI of 120.0 means a family earning the median family income has 120% of the income necessary to qualify for a conventional loan covering 80 percent of a median-priced existing single-family home. National as well as regional data is published.

Another index is the NAHB/Wells Fargo Housing Opportunity Index (HOI) published by the National Association of Home Builders (NAHB) and Wells Fargo. The index measures the number of houses sold in an area that were deemed affordable based on income and housing costs. Both national data and data by metropolitan area are published.

The Chicago-based Center for Neighborhood Technology published the Housing + Transportation Affordability Index, which provides a "comprehensive view of affordability that includes both the cost of housing and the cost of transportation at the neighborhood level" in the US.

== See also ==
- Affordable housing by country
- House price index
- Real-estate bubble#Housing affordability measures
- List of countries by home ownership rate
- Median house price to income ratio
- Real estate appraisal
