= Danish property bubble of 2000s =

Economic bubble

During the Danish property bubble of 2001 through 2006, Danish property prices rose faster than at any point in history, in some years increasing by more than 25%.

Some of the rise can be attributed to falling interest rates, the introduction of new loan types (such as interest-only mortgages), improving economy and increasing urbanisation, higher wages along with other factors. Some observers have also noted increased interest in homes and a dramatic increase in the number of TV programs regarding home decoration, home sales, gardening etc. The increasing number of parents buying apartments for their children is also an important factor, dramatically increasing the demand on smaller apartments, typically 2 - 3 rooms, thus giving rising prices from the lower segment of apartments.

However, many banks and analysts acknowledge that prices have increased more than can be explained by their models even when taking the economic factors into account and that homes have indeed become less affordable. In particular, it is becoming increasingly difficult for first-time buyers to enter the market, and they now make up a historically low fraction of all buyers.

This has led some observers to speculate that the Danish real estate market may be in a bubble where price increases have been fueled by speculation beyond what can be justified by fundamental economics. Some have warned that the market may be in for a correction, i.e., major price decreases. Still, as of March 2007, this has not occurred. Apartments in Copenhagen have fallen 7% in the first quarter of 2007 and the supply is still rising.

However, there are signs that the market is softening and prices have fallen in some areas. In 2006, the number of homes for sale increased dramatically, tripling in some areas. It was estimated that 10% of all apartments in Copenhagen are for sale. The total inventory of homes for sale totaled more than one average year of home sales. In the statistics for the fourth quarter 2006, some areas experienced a quarter-to-quarter price fall around 4-5%, the first significant fall in over a decade.

Two of the major real estate agencies claim they are observing price falls, with the biggest agency (Home) claiming to have observed falls since July 2006 The softening comes at a time when there has been an explosion in the building of new apartments and homes all around in the country. In Copenhagen alone, as many as 2,000 new apartments are expected to be added to the inventory during 2007.

- Denmark 2007 - -12%
