= Lists of cities in the United States =

List of lists

The following articles contain lists of cities in the United States of America:

- Lists of populated places in the United States - Lists of U.S. cities by state
- List of United States cities by population
- List of United States cities by area
- List of United States cities by elevation
- List of most populous cities in the United States by decade
- List of United States cities by population density
- List of United States cities by Spanish-speaking population
- Lists of United States cities with large ethnic minority populations
- List of largest U.S. municipalities by race/ethnicity in 2020
