= Lebanese housing bubble =

The Lebanese housing bubble refers to an economic bubble affecting almost all of the Lebanese real estate sector, whereby property prices have risen exponentially since 2005 (an average 5-fold increase as of February 2010), while the GDP has risen only around 52% during that same period.

== Current status of the bubble ==
The Lebanese GDP per capita is around US$13,000 (after taxes) while the Lebanese working abroad make on average around $30,000 /year (after taxes). A decent housing situation far away from Beirut can cost around $150,000, a decent housing in the suburbs of Beirut can easily cost 4 times that amount, while decent housing in the Beirut Central District could cost millions. Since home prices are rising constantly, many Lebanese and other investors are buying (through a mortgage) houses in order to resell them later (to other potential investors) at inflated prices. This strategy, as well as other deceptive strategies by the real estate agents left many Lebanese, both inside and outside Lebanon, unable to buy property in Lebanon anymore. Additionally, the inflated home prices are leading to an increase in rental prices, further increasing inflation and decreasing the real income of the Lebanese living in Lebanon. Other Lebanese who are end-buyers (e.g. not thinking of reselling their home) are committing to long term and risky loans in order to repay their mortgage. Since the banks only give 60% of the price of the house,

== Counter argument ==
Despite slowing local demand, high real estate prices are sustained for several reasons. First, Lebanon's real estate sector faces currently real demand and not much speculative demand. In fact, Lebanese residents account for the largest portion of demand for property. Hence, Lebanon's real estate sector does not encompass high-risk associated with speculative pressure that has been witnessed in other countries during the 2008 financial crisis. This explains the stickiness in property prices, which did not adjust downward, given the continued momentum in demand by end-users despite the slowing overall real estate market. Second, the scarcity of land and mounting construction of luxurious residences exert upward pressure on property prices. Third, the increase in real estate demand by displaced Syrian nationals is playing an important role in compensating for reduced local demand, hence contributing to further stickiness in real estate prices.

== Lack of data ==
A speculative bubble reflects a situation in which asset prices are consistently trading at considerably higher values than intrinsic values. The determination that there is a speculative bubble is therefore contingent on the availability of reliable price data and a model to determine intrinsic values.

There are no official and reliable statistics in Lebanon to allow for such an objective determination. While GDP numbers are widely available - US$13,200 (2009 est.) -, there is no reliable real estate price index. There is also no current survey of quality of housing in Lebanon, which could be used to determine intrinsic values for houses. The lack of reliable data shows up in discussions of house prices in the Lebanese press, where in the same article different price increases are cited.

Thus, discussion of the "Lebanese housing bubble" relies on subjective evaluations of the evolution of observed real estate prices relative to their intrinsic values.

In addition, there is no reliable data to estimate the average income of the Lebanese working abroad, complicating the analysis of likely reasons for a possible housing bubble.
