= Polish property bubble =

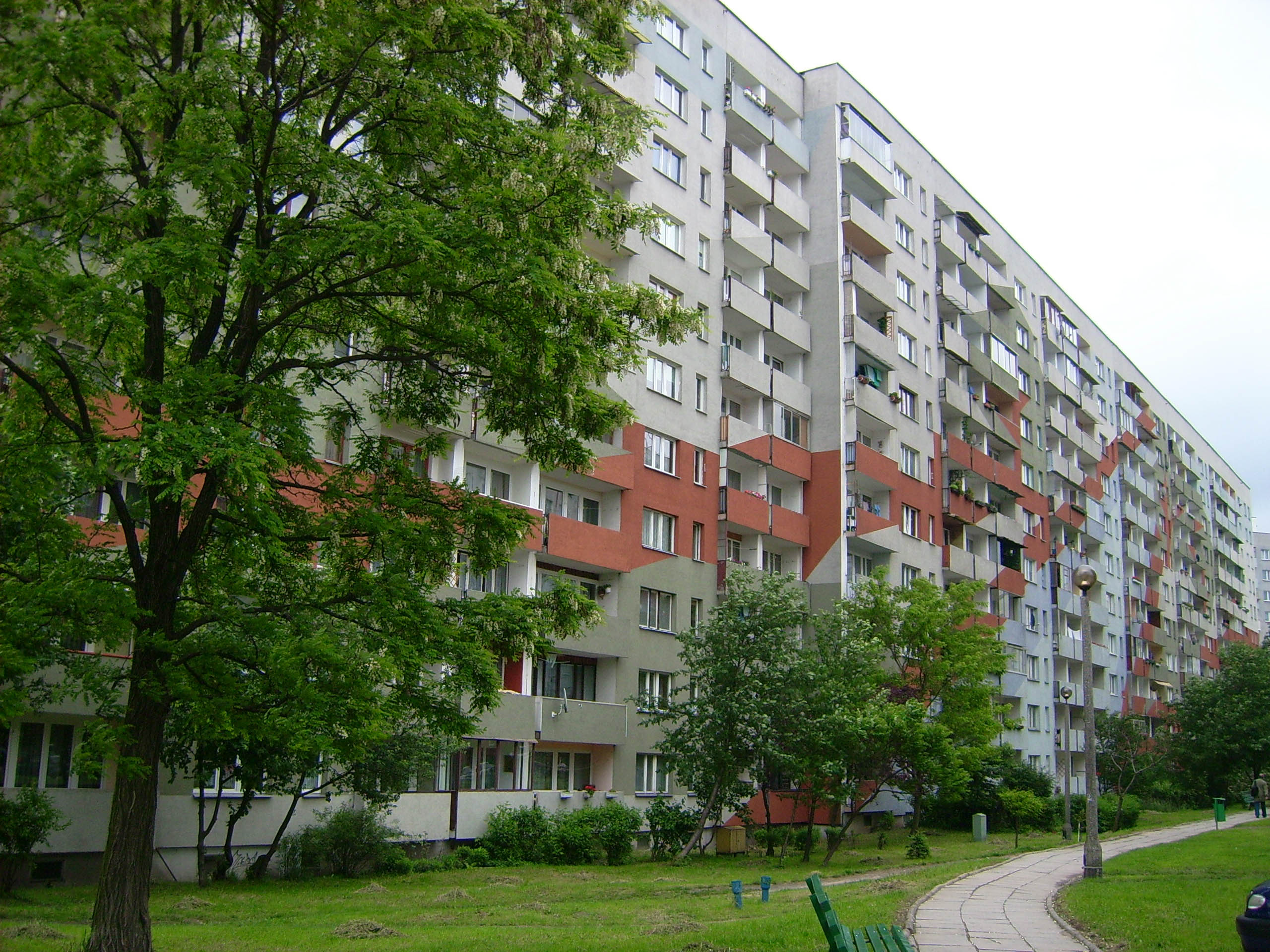
Block of flats in Kraków

Real estate prices rose drastically from 2002 to 2008 in Poland. Between June 2006 and June 2007 the average price of one square metre of residential area in Warsaw rose from 6,683 PLN (1,636 EUR) to 9,540 PLN (2,519 EUR), or 50% in euro terms. A peak in prices occurred in autumn 2008 as the average price of a square meter of residential space in Poland started to drop by 5% in nominal terms or 10% per year in real terms.

In Warsaw, Poland's capital city, the average price per square meter declined from 9,000 PLN (2,500 EUR) in 2008 to 7,400 PLN (1,850 EUR) in 2013.

In early 2007, it can be argued that the Polish property market began to show the early signs of a property bubble:

- banks increased loan periods from 30 to 50 years to extend credit limits;
- an increasing uptake of debt in family budgets;
- increasing interest rates;
- the Polish economy showing signs of overheating in a reduction of the GDP growth rate to 1.5%; and
- a stagnation of prices and dramatic drop of sales in a long period of time with dynamically increasing supply of residential properties.

As of 2013, house prices in Poland have been falling since mid-2008. Compared to pre-crisis peaks:

- House prices in Warsaw are down by 13.1%
- In Kraków, house prices are down by 17.9%
- In Poznań, house prices have fallen by 28%
- In Gdańsk, house prices plunged by 27%
- In Łódź, property prices plummeted by 35.7%

The arguments for further real estate price rises or stabilization are:

- a rapid increase of salaries - around 8% per year;
- low figures of both housing estate area and apartments per person, compared to other developed countries worldwide;
- money repatriated by Poles who have emigrated;
- rapid urbanization - the population of rural areas and small towns is declining rapidly, while the population of major urban areas is increasing quickly;

In addition, Warsaw has a population of only 2 million people – approximately 5% of the whole of the country – which is very low for a capital city. Poland is also one of many countries with a rather high house price to income ratio (13.58) and an estimated rental profitability between 3.92% to 4.31% for residential units.
