= Russian residential real estate 2020–2022 bubble =

As a reaction firstly to the COVID-19 pandemic in 2020 and then to the Russian invasion of Ukraine, prices of residential real estate in Russia increased rapidly: comparing the last quarter of 2019 with the 2nd quarter of 2022 the average increase in the entire economy amounted to 56.57% while the inflation for the same period amounted to 27.17% which means increasing 23.15% above inflation during 1.5 years.

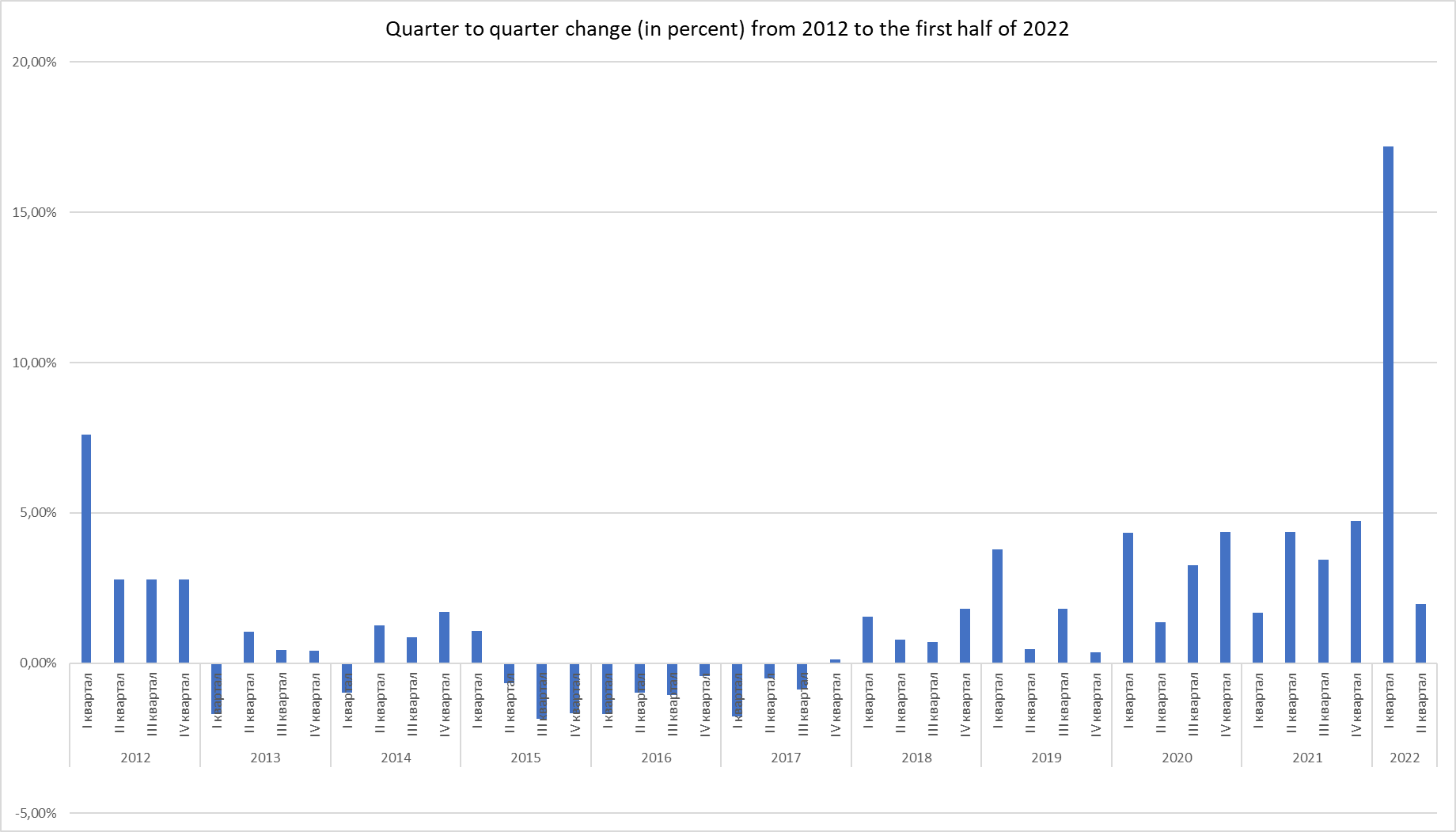

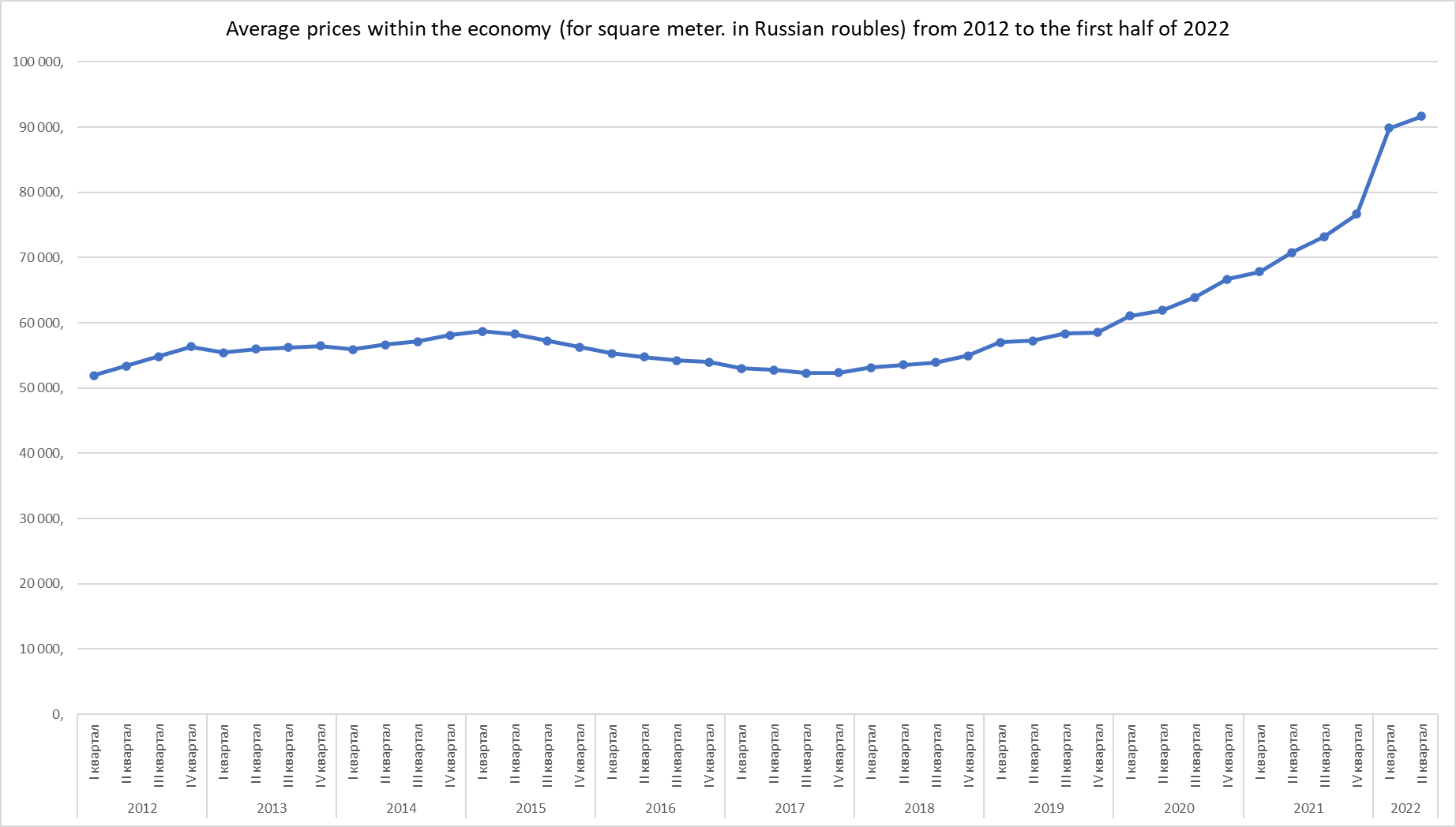
