= Economic bubble =

Temporary spike in asset prices

An economic bubble (also called a speculative bubble, asset bubble, or simply financial bubble) is a period when current asset prices greatly exceed their intrinsic valuation, where the valuation is justified by underlying long-term fundamentals of the asset. Bubbles can be caused by overly optimistic projections about the scale and sustainability of growth (e.g. dot-com bubble), and/or by the belief that intrinsic valuation is no longer relevant when making an investment (e.g. Tulip mania). They have appeared in most asset classes, including stocks (e.g. Roaring Twenties), commodities (e.g. 2007 uranium bubble), real estate (e.g. 2000s US housing bubble), and even esoteric assets (e.g. cryptocurrency bubble). Bubbles usually form as a result of either excess liquidity in markets, and/or changed investor psychology. Large multi-asset bubbles (e.g. 1980s Japanese asset bubble and the 2020–21 Everything bubble) are attributed to central banking liquidity (e.g. overuse of the Fed put).

In the early stages of a bubble, many investors do not recognise the bubble for what it is, often thinking that the increase in asset prices is justified. Therefore, bubbles are often conclusively identified only in retrospect, after the bubble has already "popped" (or "burst") and prices have crashed.

== Origin of term ==
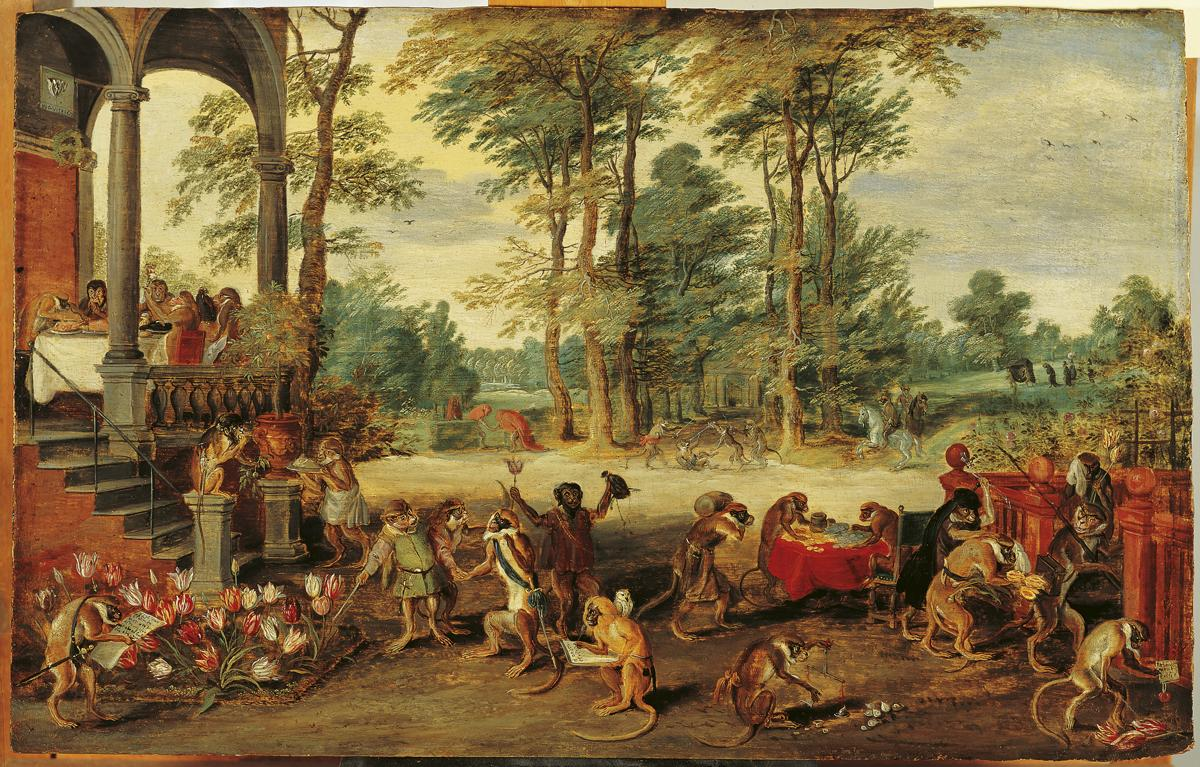
Jan Brueghel the Younger's A Satire of Tulip Mania (c. 1640)

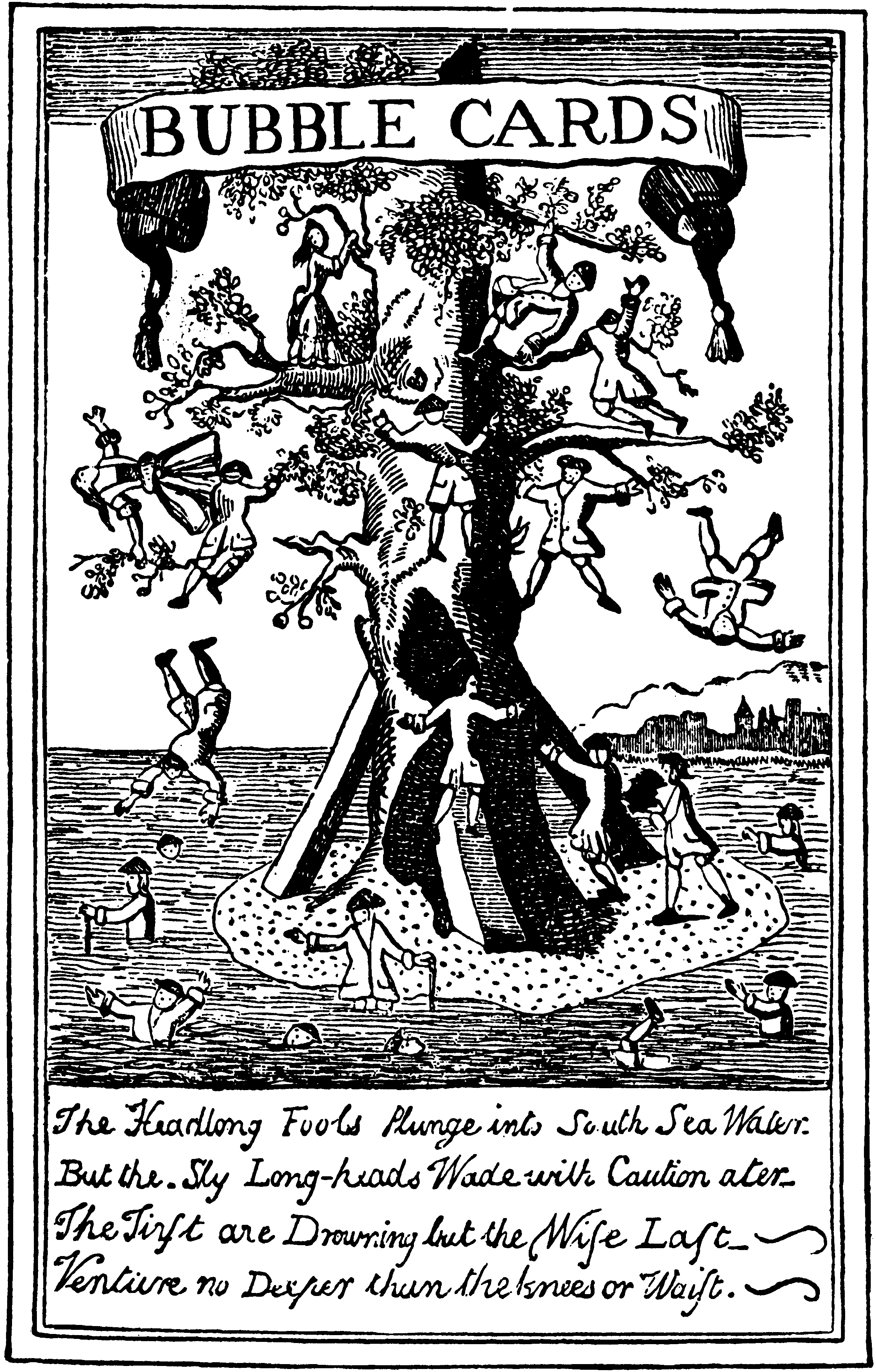
A card from the South Sea Bubble

The term "bubble", in reference to financial crisis, originated in the 1711–1720 British South Sea Bubble, and originally referred to the companies themselves, and their inflated stock, rather than to the crisis itself. This was one of the earliest modern financial crises; other episodes were referred to as "manias", as in the Dutch tulip mania. The metaphor indicated that the prices of the stock were inflated and fragile – expanded based on nothing but air, and vulnerable to a sudden burst, as in fact occurred.

Some later commentators have extended the metaphor to emphasize the suddenness, suggesting that economic bubbles end "All at once, and nothing first, / Just as bubbles do when they burst," though theories of financial crises such as debt deflation and the Financial Instability Hypothesis suggest instead that bubbles burst progressively, with the most vulnerable (most highly-leveraged) assets failing first, and then the collapse spreading throughout the economy.

== Types ==
There are different types of bubbles, with economists primarily interested in two major types of bubbles: The equity bubble and the debt bubble.

=== Equity bubble ===
An equity bubble is characterised by tangible investments and the unsustainable desire to satisfy a legitimate market in high demand. These kind of bubbles are characterised by easy liquidity, tangible and real assets, and an actual innovation that boosts confidence. The injection of funds into the business cycle is capable of accelerating the innovation process and propelling faster productivity growth. Examples of an equity bubble are the Tulip Mania, the cryptocurrency bubble, the dot-com bubble, and the Roaring Twenties .

=== Debt bubble ===
A debt bubble is characterised by intangible or credit based investments with little ability to satisfy growing demand in a non-existent market. These bubbles are not backed by real assets and are based on frivolous lending in the hope of returning a profit or security. These bubbles usually end in debt deflation causing bank runs or a currency crisis when the government can no longer maintain the fiat currency. Examples are the Roaring Twenties stock market bubble (which caused the Great Depression) and the United States housing bubble (which caused the Great Recession).

== Impact ==
The impact of economic bubbles is debated within and between schools of economic thought; they are not generally considered beneficial, but it is debated how harmful their formation and bursting is.

Within mainstream economics, many believe that bubbles cannot be identified in advance, cannot be prevented from forming, that attempts to "prick" the bubble may cause financial crisis, and that instead authorities should wait for bubbles to burst of their own accord, dealing with the aftermath via monetary policy and fiscal policy.

Political economist Robert E. Wright argues that bubbles can be identified before the fact with high confidence.

In addition, the crash which usually follows an economic bubble can destroy a large amount of wealth and cause continuing economic malaise; this view is particularly associated with the debt-deflation theory of Irving Fisher, and elaborated within Post-Keynesian economics.

A protracted period of low risk premiums can simply prolong the downturn in asset price deflation, as was the case of the Great Depression in the 1930s for much of the world and the 1990s for Japan. Not only can the aftermath of a crash devastate the economy of a nation, but its effects can also reverberate beyond its borders.

=== Effect upon spending ===
Another important aspect of economic bubbles is their impact on spending habits. Market participants with overvalued assets tend to spend more because they "feel" richer (the wealth effect). Many observers quote the housing market in the United Kingdom, Australia, New Zealand, Spain and parts of the United States in recent times, as an example of this effect. When the bubble inevitably bursts, those who hold on to these overvalued assets usually experience a feeling of reduced wealth and tend to cut discretionary spending at the same time, hindering economic growth or, worse, exacerbating the economic slowdown.

In an economy with a central bank, the bank may therefore attempt to keep an eye on asset price appreciation and take measures to curb high levels of speculative activity in financial assets. This is usually done by increasing the interest rate (that is, the cost of borrowing money). Historically, this is not the only approach taken by central banks. It has been argued that they should stay out of it and let the bubble, if it is one, take its course.

== In economics ==
Investor George Soros, influenced by ideas put forward by his tutor, Karl Popper (1957), has been an active promoter of the relevance of reflexivity to economics, first propounding it publicly in his 1987 book The alchemy of finance. He regards his insights into market behaviour from applying the principle as a major factor in the success of his financial career.

Reflexivity is inconsistent with general equilibrium theory, which stipulates that markets move towards equilibrium and that non-equilibrium fluctuations are merely random noise that will soon be corrected. In equilibrium theory, prices in the long run at equilibrium reflect the underlying economic fundamentals, which are unaffected by prices. Reflexivity asserts that prices do in fact influence the fundamentals and that these newly influenced sets of fundamentals then proceed to change expectations, thus influencing prices; the process continues in a self-reinforcing pattern. Because the pattern is self-reinforcing, markets tend towards disequilibrium. Sooner or later they reach a point where the sentiment is reversed and negative expectations become self-reinforcing in the downward direction, thereby explaining the familiar pattern of boom and bust cycles. An example Soros cites is the procyclical nature of lending, that is, the willingness of banks to ease lending standards for real estate loans when prices are rising, then raising standards when real estate prices are falling, reinforcing the boom and bust cycle. He further suggests that property price inflation is essentially a reflexive phenomenon: house prices are influenced by the sums that banks are prepared to advance for their purchase, and these sums are determined by the banks' estimation of the prices that the property would command.

Soros has often claimed that his grasp of the principle of reflexivity is what has given him his "edge" and that it is the major factor contributing to his successes as a trader. For several decades there was little sign of the principle being accepted in mainstream economic circles, but there has been an increase of interest following the crash of 2008, with academic journals, economists, and investors discussing his theories.

Economist and former columnist of the Financial Times, Anatole Kaletsky, argued that Soros' concept of reflexivity is useful in understanding China's economy and how the Chinese government manages it.

Eugene Fama, the Nobel laureate in economics who has often been described as "the father of modern finance", has expressed skepticism about the notion that economic bubbles can be identified. He argues that for something to be a bubble, its ending needs to be predicted in real time, not just after the fact. He argues that conventional rhetoric about bubbles proposes no testable propositions and no ways to measure a bubble.

== Causes ==
It has been suggested that bubbles may be rational, intrinsic, and contagious. To date, there is no widely accepted theory to explain their occurrence. Recent computer-generated agency models suggest excessive leverage could be a key factor in causing financial bubbles.

Puzzlingly for some, bubbles occur even in highly predictable experimental markets, where uncertainty is eliminated and market participants should be able to calculate the intrinsic value of the assets simply by examining the expected stream of dividends. Nevertheless, bubbles have been observed repeatedly in experimental markets, even with participants such as business students, managers, and professional traders. Experimental bubbles have proven robust to a variety of conditions, including short-selling, margin buying, and insider trading.

While there is no clear agreement on what causes bubbles, there is evidence to suggest that they are not caused by bounded rationality or assumptions about the irrationality of others, as assumed by greater fool theory. It has also been shown that bubbles appear even when market participants are well capable of pricing assets correctly. Further, it has been shown that bubbles appear even when speculation is not possible or when over-confidence is absent.

More recent theories of asset bubble formation suggest that they are likely sociologically-driven events, thus explanations that merely involve fundamental factors or snippets of human behavior are incomplete at best. For instance, qualitative researchers Preston Teeter and Jorgen Sandberg argue that market speculation is driven by culturally-situated narratives that are deeply embedded in and supported by the prevailing institutions of the time. They cite factors such as bubbles forming during periods of innovation, easy credit, loose regulations, and internationalized investment as reasons why narratives play such an influential role in the growth of asset bubbles.

=== Liquidity ===
One possible cause of bubbles is excessive monetary liquidity in the financial system, inducing lax or inappropriate standards of lending by the banks, which makes markets vulnerable to volatile asset price inflation caused by short-term, leveraged speculation. For example, Axel A. Weber, the former president of the Deutsche Bundesbank, has argued that "The past has shown that an overly generous provision of liquidity in global financial markets in connection with a very low level of interest rates promotes the formation of asset-price bubbles."

According to the explanation, excessive monetary liquidity (easy credit, large disposable incomes) potentially occurs while fractional reserve banks are implementing expansionary monetary policy (i.e. lowering of interest rates and flushing the financial system with money supply); this explanation may differ in certain details according to economic philosophy. Those who believe the money supply is controlled exogenously by a central bank may attribute an 'expansionary monetary policy' to that bank and (should one exist) a governing body or institution; others who believe that the money supply is created endogenously by the banking sector may attribute such a 'policy' to the behavior of the financial sector itself, and view the state as a passive or reactive factor. This may determine how central or relatively minor/inconsequential policies like fractional reserve banking and the central bank's efforts to raise or lower short-term interest rates are to one's view on the creation, inflation and ultimate implosion of an economic bubble. Explanations focusing on interest rates tend to take on a common form, however: when interest rates are set excessively low (regardless of the mechanism by which that is accomplished) investors tend to avoid putting their capital into savings accounts. Instead, investors tend to leverage their capital by borrowing from banks and invest the leveraged capital in financial assets such as company shares and real estate. Risky leveraged behavior like speculation and Ponzi schemes can lead to an increasingly fragile economy, and may also be part of what pushes asset prices artificially upward until the bubble pops.

But these [ongoing economic crises] aren't just a series of unrelated accidents. Instead, what we're seeing is what happens when too much money is chasing too few investment opportunities.

— Paul Krugman

Economic bubbles often occur when too much money is chasing too few assets, causing both good assets and bad assets to appreciate excessively beyond their fundamentals to an unsustainable level. Once the bubble bursts, the fall in prices causes the collapse of unsustainable investment schemes (especially speculative and/or Ponzi investments, but not exclusively so), which leads to a crisis of consumer (and investor) confidence that may result in a financial panic and/or financial crisis. If there is a monetary authority like a central bank, it may take measures to soak up the liquidity in the financial system in an attempt to prevent a collapse of its currency. This may involve actions like bailouts of the financial system, but also others that reverse the trend of monetary accommodation, commonly termed forms of 'contractionary monetary policy'.

These measures may include raising interest rates, which tends to make investors become more risk averse and thus avoid leveraged capital because the costs of borrowing may become too expensive. There may also be countermeasures taken pre-emptively during periods of strong economic growth, such as increasing capital reserve requirements and implementing regulation that checks and/or prevents processes leading to over-expansion and excessive leveraging of debt. Ideally, such countermeasures lessen the impact of a downturn by strengthening financial institutions while the economy is strong.

Advocates of perspectives stressing the role of credit money in an economy often refer to (such) bubbles as "credit bubbles", and look at such measures of financial leverage as debt-to-GDP ratios to identify bubbles. Typically the collapse of any economic bubble results in an economic contraction termed (if less severe) a recession or (if more severe) a depression; what economic policies to follow in reaction to such a contraction is a hotly debated perennial topic of political economy.

=== Psychology ===
==== Greater fool theory ====
Greater fool theory states that bubbles are driven by the behavior of perennially optimistic market participants (the fools) who buy overvalued assets in anticipation of selling it to other speculators (the greater fools) at a much higher price. According to this explanation, the bubbles continue as long as the fools can find greater fools to pay up for the overvalued asset. The bubbles will end only when the greater fool becomes the greatest fool who pays the top price for the overvalued asset and can no longer find another buyer to pay for it at a higher price. This theory is popular among laity but has not yet been fully confirmed by empirical research.

==== Extrapolation ====
The term "bubble" should indicate a price that no reasonable future outcome can justify.

— Clifford Asness

Extrapolation is projecting historical data into the future on the same basis; if prices have risen at a certain rate in the past, they will continue to rise at that rate forever. The argument is that investors tend to extrapolate past extraordinary returns on investment of certain assets into the future, causing them to overbid those risky assets in order to attempt to continue to capture those same rates of return.

Overbidding on certain assets will at some point result in uneconomic rates of return for investors; only then the asset price deflation will begin. When investors feel that they are no longer well compensated for holding those risky assets, they will start to demand higher rates of return on their investments.

==== Herding ====
Another related explanation used in behavioral finance lies in herd behavior, the fact that investors tend to buy or sell in the direction of the market trend. This is sometimes helped by technical analysis that tries precisely to detect those trends and follow them, which creates a self-fulfilling prophecy.

Investment managers, such as stock mutual fund managers, are compensated and retained in part due to their performance relative to peers. Taking a conservative or contrarian position as a bubble builds results in performance unfavorable to peers. This may cause customers to go elsewhere and can affect the investment manager's own employment or compensation. The typical short-term focus of U.S. equity markets exacerbates the risk for investment managers that do not participate during the building phase of a bubble, particularly one that builds over a longer period of time. In attempting to maximize returns for clients and maintain their employment, they may rationally participate in a bubble they believe to be forming, as the likely shorter-term benefits of doing so outweigh the likely longer-term risks.

==== Moral hazard ====
Moral hazard is the prospect that a party insulated from risk may behave differently from the way it would behave if it were fully exposed to the risk. A person's belief that they are responsible for the consequences of their own actions is an essential aspect of rational behavior. An investor must balance the possibility of making a return on their investment with the risk of making a loss – the risk-return relationship. A moral hazard can occur when this relationship is interfered with, often via government policy.

A recent example is the Troubled Asset Relief Program (TARP), signed into law by U.S. President George W. Bush on 3 October 2008 to provide a government bailout for many financial and non-financial institutions who speculated in high-risk financial instruments during the housing boom condemned by a 2005 story in The Economist titled "The worldwide rise in house prices is the biggest bubble in history". A historical example was intervention by the Dutch Parliament during the great Tulip Mania of 1637.

Other causes of perceived insulation from risk may derive from a given entity's predominance in a market relative to other players, and not from state intervention or market regulation. A firm – or several large firms acting in concert (see cartel, oligopoly and collusion) – with very large holdings and capital reserves could instigate a market bubble by investing heavily in a given asset, creating a relative scarcity which drives up that asset's price. Because of the signaling power of the large firm or group of colluding firms, the firm's smaller competitors will follow suit, similarly investing in the asset due to its price gains.

However, in relation to the party instigating the bubble, these smaller competitors are insufficiently leveraged to withstand a similarly rapid decline in the asset's price. When the large firm, cartel or de facto collusive body perceives a maximal peak has been reached in the traded asset's price, it can then proceed to rapidly sell or "dump" its holdings of this asset on the market, precipitating a price decline that forces its competitors into insolvency, bankruptcy or foreclosure.

The large firm or cartel – which has intentionally leveraged itself to withstand the price decline it engineered – can then acquire the capital of its failing or devalued competitors at a low price as well as capture a greater market share (e.g., via a merger or acquisition which expands the dominant firm's distribution chain). If the bubble-instigating party is itself a lending institution, it can combine its knowledge of its borrowers' leveraging positions with publicly available information on their stock holdings, and strategically shield or expose them to default.

=== Other ===
Some regard bubbles as related to inflation and thus believe that the causes of inflation are also the causes of bubbles. Others take the view that there is a "fundamental value" to an asset, and that bubbles represent a rise over that fundamental value, which must eventually return to that fundamental value. There are chaotic theories of bubbles which assert that bubbles come from particular "critical" states in the market based on the communication of economic factors. Finally, others regard bubbles as necessary consequences of irrationally valuing assets solely based upon their returns in the recent past without resorting to a rigorous analysis based on their underlying "fundamentals".

== Stages ==
According to the economist Charles P. Kindleberger, the basic structure of a speculative bubble can be divided into five phases:

- Displacement: A sufficient external shock to the macroeconomic system, creating new profit opportunities.
- Boom: A rise in asset prices and speculative investments (buy now with sole intention to sell in the future at a higher price and obtain a profit).
- Euphoria: A democratization of speculative investments, and a detachment from real rational valuable objects.
- Financial distress: Prices begin to plateau, investors start considering selling to cover their liabilities.
- Revulsion: prices plummet as investors race to sell first, panic spreads and feeds back on itself.

=== Identification ===
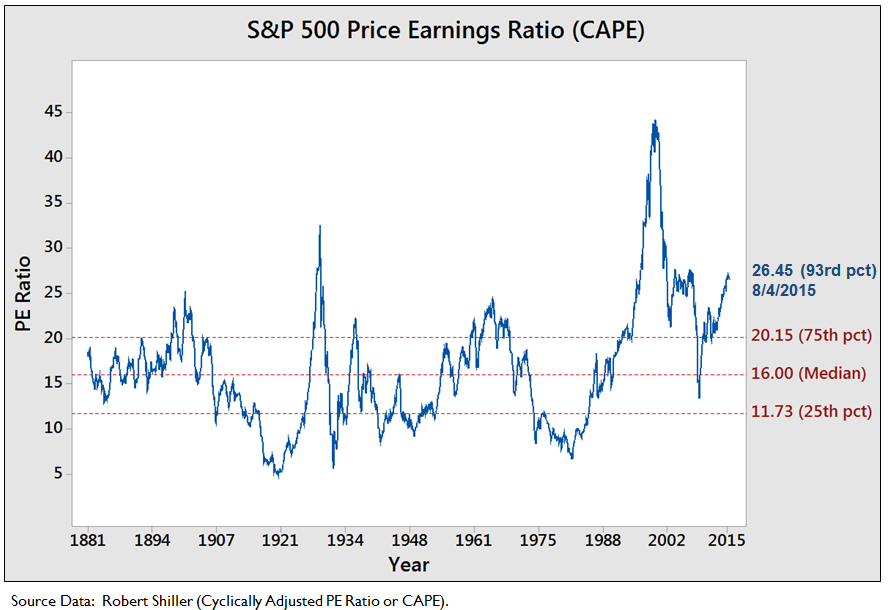
CAPE based on data from economist Robert Shiller's website, as of 8/4/2015. The 26.45 measure was 93rd percentile, meaning 93% of the time investors paid less for stocks overall relative to earnings.

Economic or asset price bubbles are often characterized by one or more of the following:

1. Unusual changes in single measures, or relationships among measures (e.g., ratios) relative to their historical levels. For example, in the housing bubble of the 2000s, the housing prices were unusually high relative to income. For stocks, the price to earnings ratio (CAPE) provides a measure of stock prices relative to corporate earnings; higher readings indicate investors are paying more for each dollar of earnings.
2. Elevated usage of debt (leverage) to purchase assets, such as purchasing stocks on margin or homes with a lower down payment.
3. Higher risk lending and borrowing behavior, such as originating loans to borrowers with lower credit quality scores (e.g., subprime borrowers), combined with adjustable rate mortgages and "interest-only" loans.
4. Rationalizing borrowing, lending, and purchase decisions based on expected future price increases rather than the ability of the borrower to repay.
5. Rationalizing asset prices by increasingly weaker arguments, such as "this time it's different" or "housing prices only go up."
6. A high presence of marketing or media coverage related to the asset.
7. Incentives that place the consequences of bad behavior by one economic actor upon another, such as the origination of mortgages to those with limited ability to repay because the mortgage could be sold or securitized, moving the consequences from the originator to the investor.
8. International trade (current account) imbalances, resulting in an excess of savings over investments, increasing the volatility of capital flow among countries. For example, the flow of savings from Asia to the U.S. was one of the drivers of the 2000s housing bubble.
9. A lower interest rate environment, which encourages lending and borrowing.

== Notable asset bubbles ==
=== Commodities ===
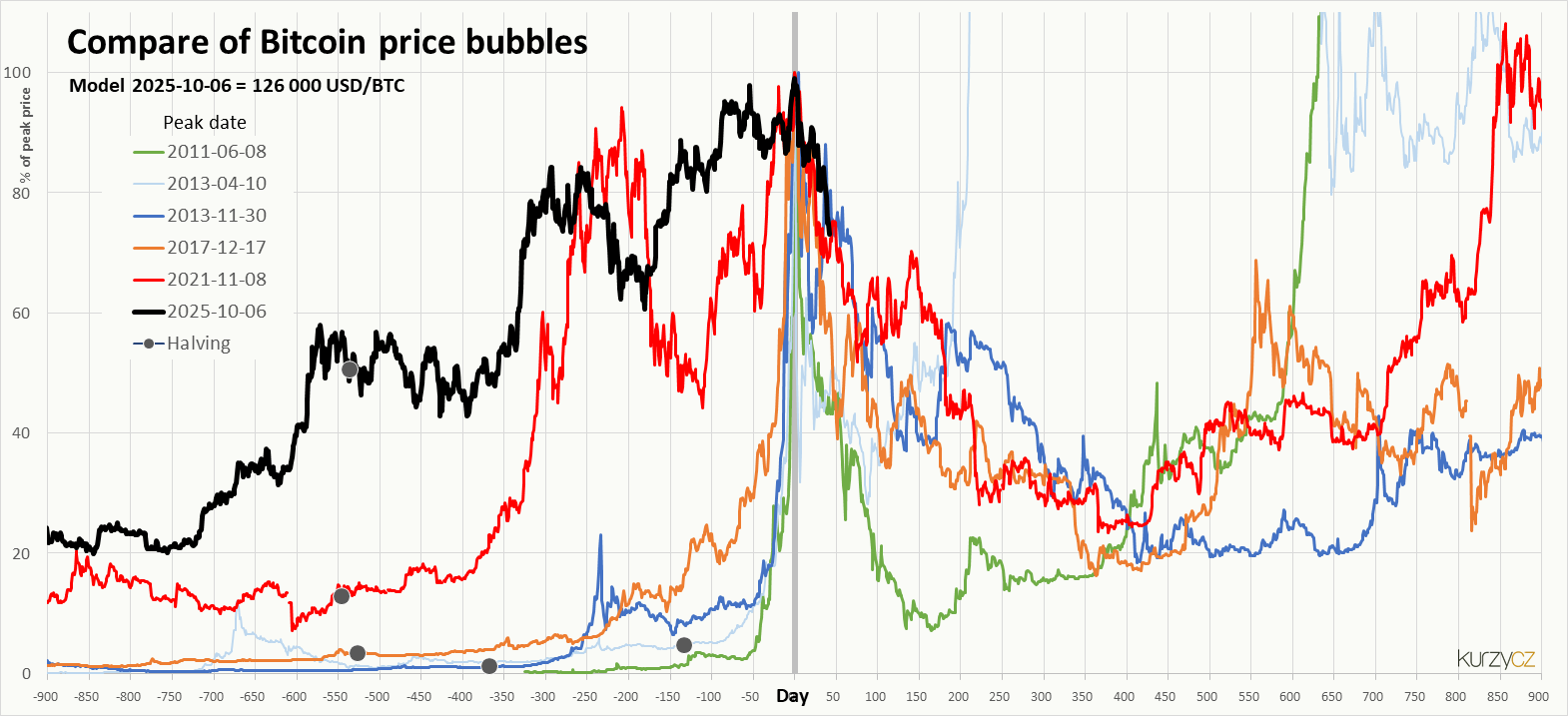
Bitcoin price gain/loss 2011, 2013

- Tulip mania (Dutch) (1634–1637)
- Comic book speculation bubble (1985–1993)
- Silver Thursday (March 27, 1980)
- Uranium bubble of 2007
- Cryptocurrency bubble (speculative) (2016–2017, 2021–present)
- Artificial intelligence bubble (speculative) (2025–present)

=== Equities ===
==== Private securities ====
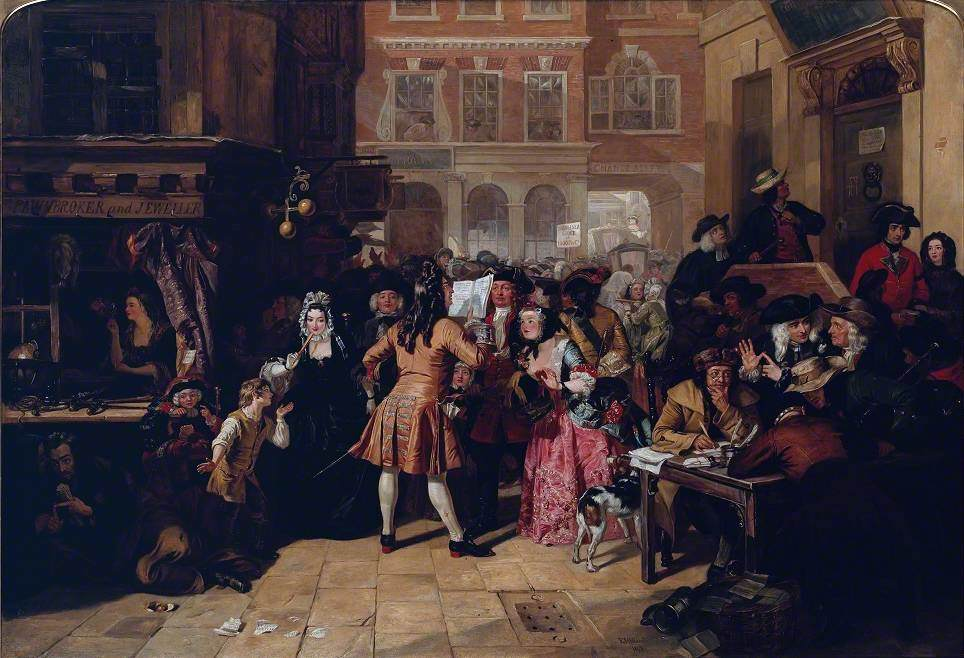
The South Sea Bubble by Edward Matthew Ward, 1847

- South Sea Company (British) (1720)
- Mississippi Company (France) (1720)
- Canal Mania (UK) (1790s–1810s)
- Railway Mania (UK) (1840s)

==== Quoted securities ====
- Roaring Twenties stock-market bubble (US) (1921–1929)
- Poseidon bubble (Australia) (1969–1970)
- Chinese stock bubble of 2007 (2003–2007)
- Dot-com bubble (US) (1996–2000)

=== Real estate ===
- Florida building bubble (US) (1922–1926)
- 2000s Property bubbles:
  - Australian property bubble
  - Irish property bubble
  - New Zealand property bubble
  - Spanish property bubble
  - Romanian property bubble
  - United States housing bubble (US) (2002–2006)

=== Debt ===
- Corporate debt bubble (2010–)

=== Multi-asset/Broad-based ===
- Japanese asset price bubble (1986–1991)
- 1997 Asian financial crisis (1997)
- Everything bubble (2020–2021)

== Notable periods post asset bubbles ==
- Panic of 1837
- Great Depression (1929–1934)
- Lost Decade (Japan) (1990–2013)
- Early 2000s recession (2002–2003)
- Great Recession (2007–2009)
- Panic of 1873

== See also ==
- Boom and bust
- Business cycle
- Carbon bubble
- Economic collapse
- Asset price inflation
- Extraordinary Popular Delusions and the Madness of Crowds
- Fictitious capital
- Financial crisis
- Hyman Minsky, especially his Financial Instability Hypothesis
- Irrational Exuberance by Robert Shiller
- Jesse Lauriston Livermore The Boy Plunger
- List of commodity booms
- List of stock market crashes and bear markets
- Non-fungible token
- Overheating (economics)
- Real estate bubble
- Reflexivity (social theory)
- Stock market crash
- Stock market crashes in India
- Speculation
- Stock market bubble
- The Age of Debt Bubbles - book describing bubbles from banking debt money creation
- Unicorn bubble
