= Romanian property bubble =

Real estate bubble in Romania

The Romanian property bubble was a real-estate bubble in Romania from the early 2000s to 2007. After a period of relative calm during the 1990s, since 2002 Romania has experienced a dramatic increase in property prices. Between 2002 and 2007, the median price for an old communist-era apartment rose by a factor of 10 (x 1000%), from around €10,000 to c. €100,000. Today some apartments in central Bucharest have prices comparable with those of properties in Paris or London, and in virtually every small town the median housing price rivals that of similar towns in the European Union.

The Romanian market is also atypical compared with other Central European countries. By contrast with Hungary, Poland or the Czech Republic subsequent to joining the European Union (where prices remained stationary), when Romania joined the EU in 2007, housing prices jumped by some 20%.

== Causes of the rise in property prices ==
The following are the most-often cited factors that have contributed to this increase in prices:

- The growth of the banking system, which made affordable mortgages possible (mortgages were almost impossible for Romanians to obtain before 2002);
- Almost 2.5 million Romanians are working abroad (mainly in Italy and Spain), enabling them to save up for an apartment in Romania;
- The growth of the economy (by approximately 6% annually since 2001), and the growth in average net monthly salary (from 100 euros in 2002 to 350 euros in August 2007);
- The poor supply of properties coupled with high demand; between 1989 and 2005, almost no new apartments were built in Romania. Some suburban development took place, but poor infrastructure (utilities, roads, public transportation) kept it from increasing the supply enough to prevent prices from increasing.
- The relatively low starting price, among the lowest in Europe in 2003, caused a spiraling frenzy of external buyers to flood the country, shortly followed by both honest and dishonest developers, builders, selling agents and intermediaries. The effect was to send demand almost vertical with simple one-bedroom apartments in 2007 costing 10 times their 2001 price, before falling by more than half or less by 2012.

== Criticisms ==
It has been argued that some of the above-mentioned potential causes of Romania's rising property prices are not significant.

- The population decreased by 10% between 1990 and 2012, which reduced the demand. Also, birthrate decreased significantly.
- Although credit is part of every bank's product portfolio nowadays, few Romanians are actually creditworthy, and their average salary is too low to enable them to purchase a home;
- The vast majority of the Romanians working abroad have low-income, low-grade jobs as construction workers, au pairs etc., and it would be difficult for most such workers to save enough to buy a property in Romania;
- Demand is not as high, and is not increasing as fast, as the market optimists estimate: the population of the country keeps falling as Romanians continue to emigrate abroad en masse (since 1 January 2007 Romania has been a Member State of the EU, which has made it easier for Romanians to travel to France, Germany and the UK);
- The decretei generation (the product of the 1970s baby boom resulting from the policies of the Nicolae Ceauşescu era) has now reached maturity, and many already own a home;
- Future foreign workers arriving from poorer countries to meet demand in Romania's job market will be too poor to buy a house in Romania.

== Popular beliefs ==
Besides the official technical and economic factors, ordinary people in Romania believe that the rise in property prices was also caused by:

- The money-laundering requirements of the various politicians, corrupt business men etc.; however, some regulations adopted after 2004 make money-laundering very difficult;
- Inflation due to the activities of real estate agents; before 2002, very few real estate agencies were operating in Romania, but in 2008 they were in the thousands; since they are unregulated, and because there is also no code of ethics for real estate agents (in fact, anyone can claim to be one), many ordinary Romanians believe that the agents are artificially increasing the prices demanded by sellers.
