= Median multiple =

Housing indicator measure of affordability

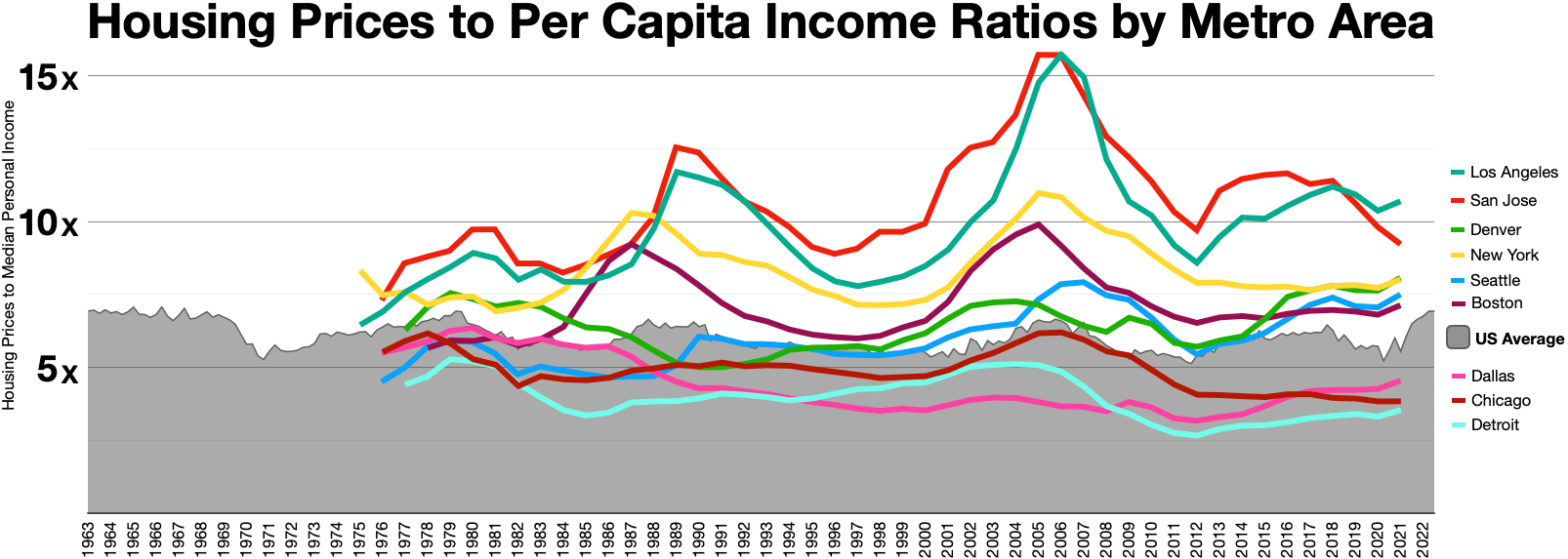
Housing prices to personal income (per capita) ratios by metro area Los Angeles San Jose Denver New York Seattle Boston United States average Dallas Chicago Detroit

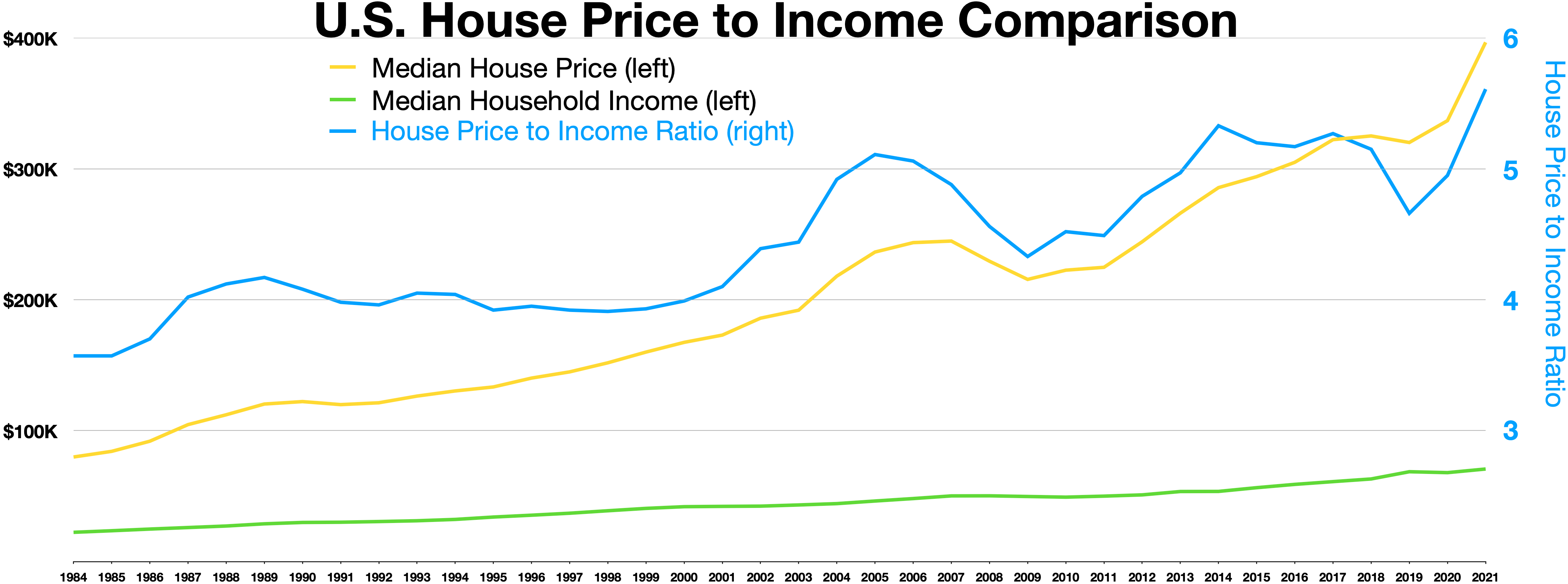
House price to income ratio Median house price (left) House price to income ratio (right) Median household income (left)

The Median multiple or Median house price to income ratio is a housing indicator used to indicate the affordability of housing in any given community. The Median house price to income ratio was the primary indicator H1 of the 1991 World Bank/UNCHS Housing Indicator system. It was subsequently used as a measure of affordability by the UN Commission for Sustainable Development, the National Association of Realtors, State of the Environment 2003 Tasmania, and the Mortgage Guide UK.

The indicator has been popularised by Demographia International, and was called the 'Median multiple' from their second comparative international survey in 2006.

The median multiple is the ratio of the median house price by the median gross (before tax) annual household income. This measure has historically hovered around a value of 3 or less, but in recent years has risen dramatically, especially in markets with public policy constraints on land and development.

== Housing Affordability Rating ==
The 2024 Demographia International Housing Affordability report uses the following affordability categories based on the median multiple for a given market:

Housing Affordability Rating	Median Multiple
Affordable	3.0 & Under
Moderately Unaffordable	3.1 to 4.0
Seriously Unaffordable	4.1 to 5.0
Severely Unaffordable	5.1 to 8.9
Impossibly Unaffordable	9.0 & Over

== See also ==
- Real-estate bubble#Housing affordability measures
- Affordable housing
- Inclusionary zoning
- Land-use planning
- Land titling
- Real estate
- Demographia
