= Affordable housing by country =

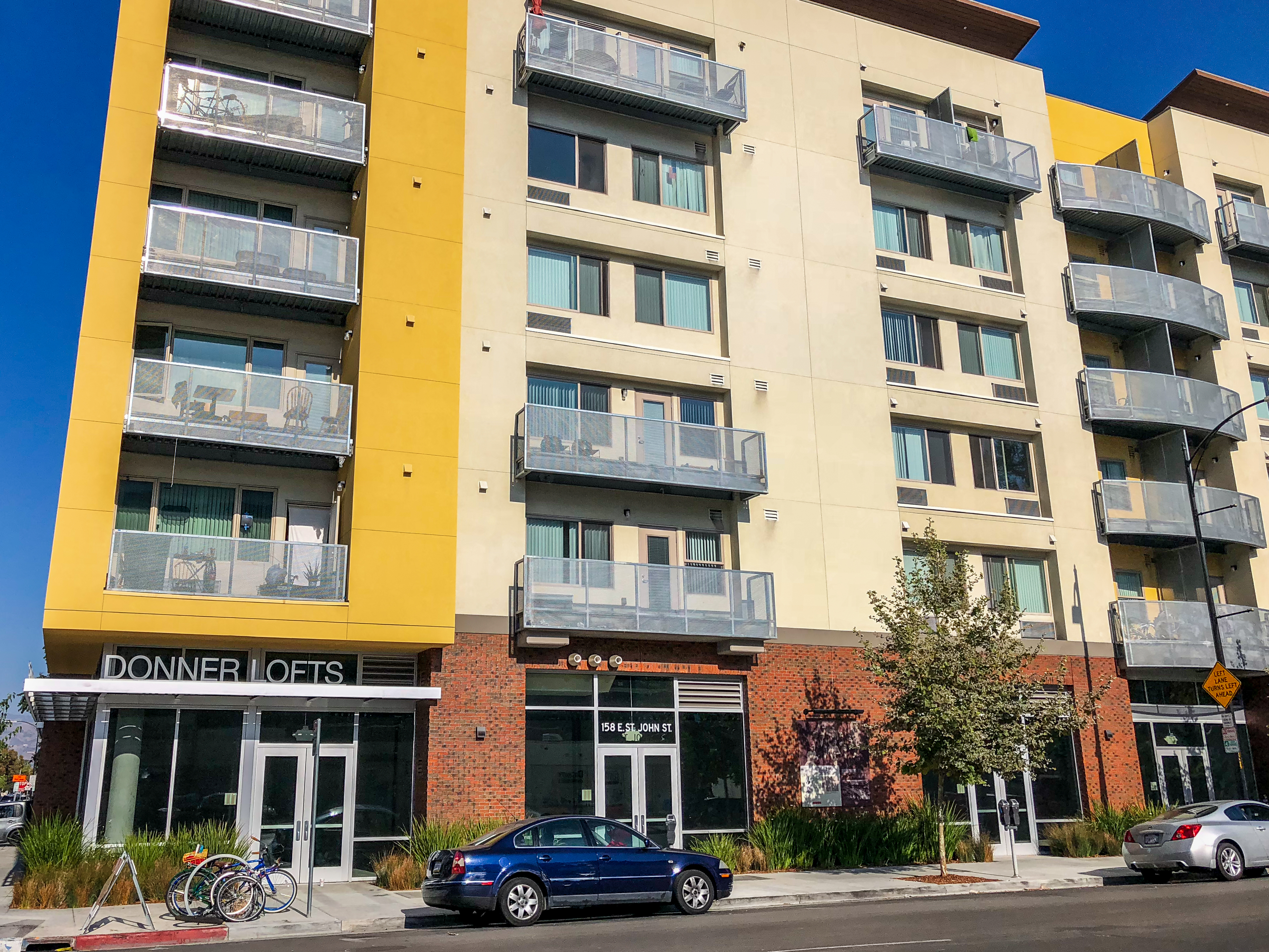
Affordable housing in San Jose, California

Affordable housing is housing that is deemed affordable to those with a median household income as rated by the national government or a local government by a recognized housing affordability index. A general rule is no more than 30% of gross monthly income should be spent on housing, to be considered affordable as the challenges of promoting affordable housing varies by location.

== Australia ==
Australians in receipt of many social security benefits from Centrelink who rent housing from a private landlord are eligible for rent assistance, a subsidy paid directly to the tenant in addition to the basic Centrelink benefit, such as the Age Pension or the Disability Pension. The amount of rent assistance paid depends on the amount of rent payable, whether the tenant has dependents, and how many dependents there are. Tenants who live in public housing in Australia are not eligible for rent assistance.

Australians buying a home for the first time are eligible for a first homeowner grant. These grants were introduced on 1 July 2000, and are jointly funded by the Commonwealth government and the state and territory governments. First home buyers are currently eligible for a grant of A$7000 to alleviate the costs of entering the housing market.

The Commonwealth government in 2008 introduced first home saver accounts, whereby those saving for a new home are eligible for government contributions to their savings account, subject to conditions.

=== Western Australia ===
==== Department of Housing Affordable Homes Scheme ====
The long-term goal of the department is to deliver at least 20,000 more affordable homes by 2020 for low to moderate income earners, through the Opening Doors Scheme. Opening Doors offers two ways for Western Australians to own their own homes.

===== Shared Home Ownership =====
The Shared Home Ownership is the only scheme of its kind in Australia. This scheme is similar to one which was set by the Housing Authority in Malta (Europe). Western Australians can purchase their own home with help from the Department of Housing with a SharedStart loan through Keystart, the Government's lending provider.

With shared ownership, the initial cost of buying a home is reduced, as the department retains up to 30% of the property. The department's share depends on your borrowing capacity, household size, and the location and type of property. In the future, the buyer may have the option to purchase the full amount or sell the home back to the department. With a ShareStart loan, citizens can purchase newly built homes and off-the–plan properties offered by the Department of Housing.

===== Affordable House Sales =====
The Department of Housing (the Housing Authority), through the Housing Authority, now offers Affordable House Sales to the general public. Properties are available to anyone interested in purchasing a home. The department works closely with industry to ensure that properties being developed for sale are affordable for those on low-to-moderate incomes.

== Austria ==
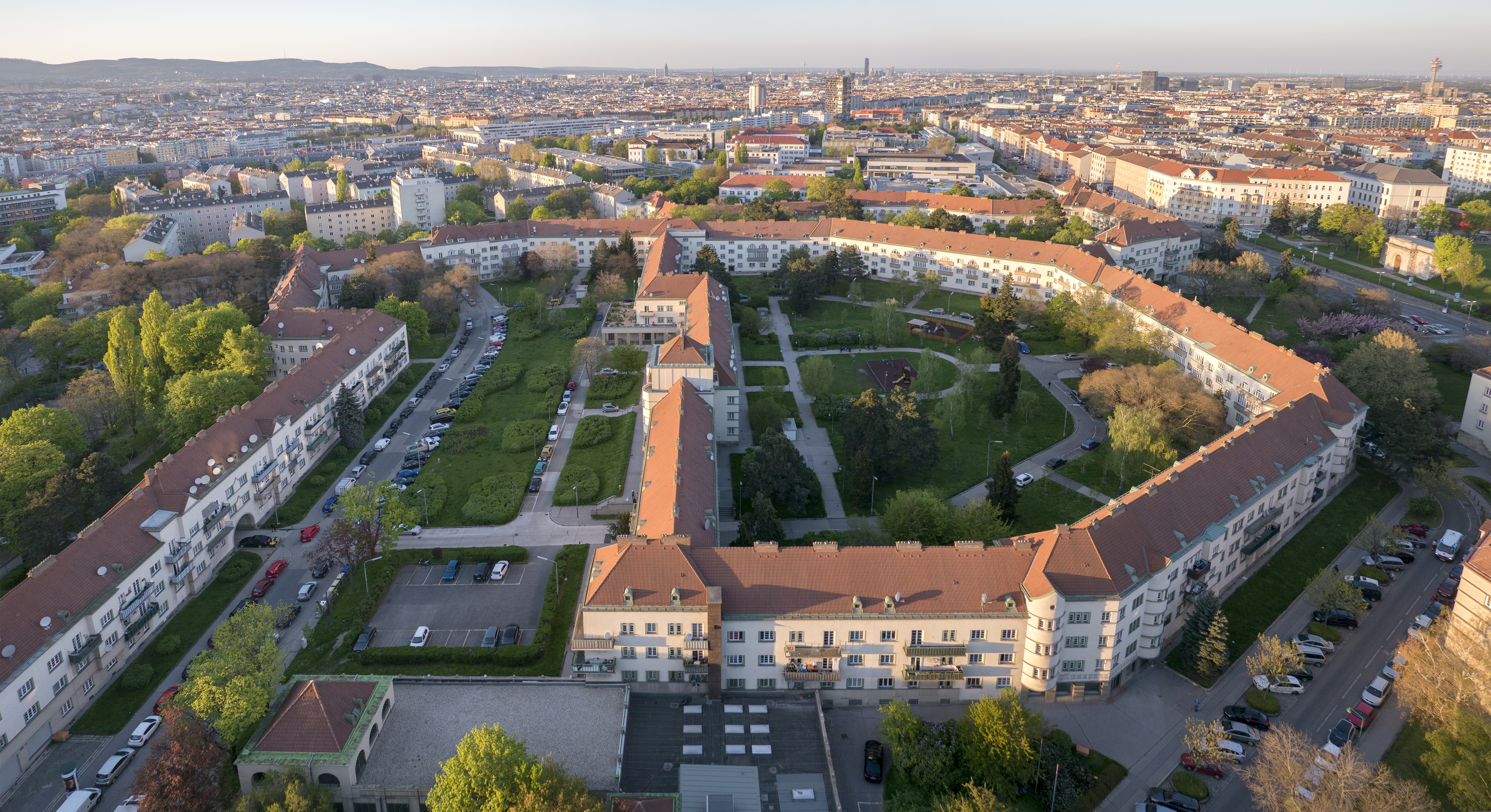
The George-Washington-Hof is protected public housing in Vienna.

In Vienna, Austria, social housing may be completely government built and run or include a mixture of public land and private-sector construction and management. Combined, the two types of housing represent about 46 percent of the city's housing stock (26% government owned and managed and 20% a public/private partnership) and house people with a wide variety of incomes. These social housing units are often linked to businesses, services, and transit amenities. Justin Kadi, a researcher at the University of Technology in Vienna, states that the social housing units also drives down rents in the private market because the city is the biggest landlord. The city continually adds units to the already large existing housing stock to ensure housing availability.

== Canada ==
In Canada affordability is one of three factors, along with adequacy and suitability, used to determine core housing needs. Canada ranks among the lowest of the most developed countries for housing affordability.

Since the 1980s the federal government has played a smaller and smaller role in funding affordable and social housing. It has devolved responsibilities to provinces, some of whom have in turn devolved responsibilities to municipalities. In 1995 the federal government ended funding for the development of affordable housing.

=== Ontario ===
In 2002, the Social Housing Services Corporation (SHSC) was created by the Province of Ontario to provide group services for social housing providers (public, non-profit and co-op housing) following the downloading of responsibility for over 270,000 social housing units to local municipalities. It is a non-profit corporation governed by a board of municipal, non-profit and co-op housing representatives. Its mandate is to provide Ontario housing providers and service managers with bulk purchasing, insurance, investment and information services.

With an annual budget of $4.5 million, SHSC and its two subsidiaries, SOHO and SHSC Financial Inc. offers a dedicated insurance program for social housing providers, bulk gas purchasing and an energy efficiency retrofit program that coordinates energy audits, expertise, funding, bulk purchasing of energy-efficient goods, training and education, and data evaluation. SHSC manages and provides investment advice to housing providers on capital reserves valued at more than $390 million. Working closely with other housing sector organizations and non-governmental organizations, SHSC also supports and develops independent housing-related research, including a new Housing Internship program for graduate-level researchers.

In 1998 the Ontario government eliminated rent control in the hopes of increasing housing supply by stimulating investment. The following years saw the construction of only 8.5% of the promised new development. This period also saw the rise of condo development and the fall of rental development. In 2018, Doug Ford's conservative government eliminated rent control on all new buildings, additions to buildings, and basement apartments, that are occupied for the first time for residential purposes after November 15, 2018. From October 2018 to October 2023 average rent in Ontario has increased 34%.

=== Alberta ===
Alberta has remained generally affordable, with the City of Calgary, as of 2016, the majority of households in Calgary, 78%, were able to meet their housing needs in the marketplace. As of 2024, Calgary Housing Company, the affordable housing provider in Calgary noted that they managed housing for almost 10,000 households – about 27,000 Calgarians, including 15,000 children.

=== British Columbia ===
There has been a move toward the integration of affordable social housing with market housing and other uses, such as the 2006–10 redevelopment of the Woodward's building site in Vancouver.

Legislation to help make home ownership accessible to middle-class families, and other measures aimed to make sure that British Columbians can continue to live, work and raise families in British Columbia such as increasing rental property supply was passed and will take effect on August 2, 2016.

== China ==
China is also experiencing a gap between housing prices and affordability as it moves away from an in-kind welfare benefits system to a market-oriented allocation system (Hui et al. 2007). Most urban housing prior to 1978 in the planned-economy era consisted of nearly free dwellings produced and allocated by the unsustainable single-channel state-funded system. The goal of China's housing reform started in 1978 was to gradually transform housing from a "free good" to a "subsidized good" and eventually to a "commodity", the price of which reflects true production costs and a market profit margin. In 1998 China accelerated its urban housing reform further moving away from an in-kind welfare benefits system to a market-oriented allocation system, with the state reducing its role in housing provision. The reform is followed by increasing home ownership, housing consumption, real estate investment, as well as skyrocketing housing prices.

High housing prices are a major issue in a number of big cities in China. Starting in 2005, the high housing appreciation rate became a serious affordability problem for middle and low-income families: in 2004 the housing appreciation rate of 17.8%, almost twice the income growth rate of 10% (NBSC 2011). Municipal governments have responded to the calling for increased housing supply to middle and low-income families through a number of policies and housing programs, among which are the Affordable Housing Program and the Housing Provident Fund Program.

The Affordable Housing Program (commonly known as the "Economical and Comfortable Housing Program, or 经济适用房) is designed to provide affordable housing to middle- to low-income households to encourage home ownership. In 1998 the Department of Construction and Ministry of Finance jointly promulgated "The Method of Urban Affordable Housing Construction Managing," marked the start of the program. Aimed at middle- to low-income households (annual income less than 30,000 to 70,000 RMB according to the size of the household and the specific area), this public housing program provides housing (usually 60–110 square meters) at affordable price (usually 50–70% market price).

Within the policies and mandates set by the central government, local governments are responsible for the operation of the program. Local governments usually appropriate state-owned land to real estate developers, who are responsible for the finance and construction of affordable housing. The profit for real estate developers is controlled to be less than 3%, so as to keep the price of housing at the affordable level. Individuals need to apply for the affordable housing through household and income investigation.

The program is controversial in recent years because of insufficient construction, poor administration, and widespread corruption. Local government has limited incentive to provide affordable housing, as it means lower revenue from land-transferring fees and lower local GDP. As a result, the funding of the program has been decreasing ever since its inception, and the affordable housing construction rate dropped from 15.6% (1997) to 5.2% (2008). Because of the limited supply of affordable housing and excessive housing demand from the middle- to low-income populations, affordable housing units are usually sold at high market price. In many cities, ineligible high-income households own affordable housing units whereas many qualified families are denied access.

Housing Provident Fund (HPF) Program is another policy effort to provide affordable housing. China introduced the Housing Provident Fund (HPF) program nationwide in 1995. It is similar to housing fund programs in other countries such as Thailand and Singapore. HPF provides a mechanism allowing potential purchasers who have an income to save for and eventually purchase a unit dwelling (which may be a formerly public housing unit). The HPF includes a subsidized savings program linked to a retirement account, subsidized mortgage rates and price discounts for housing purchases.

== Denmark ==
In Denmark, affordable housing constitutes around 20% of the housing stock, with approximately 560,000 affordable housing homes accommodating nearly 1 million people out of a total population of 5.8 million. The Danish government has taken steps to support the development and renovation of affordable housing to address climate impacts and promote a circular economy. In 2020, the government allocated EUR 5.5 billion for 'Green renovations' and the construction of new affordable housing, with the aim of reducing greenhouse gas emissions by 70% by 2030 and achieving climate neutrality by 2050.

However, a recent EU report highlights the critical housing situation in Denmark, particularly affecting low-income families in urban areas like Copenhagen. The report emphasizes the need for action to address the challenges related to affordable housing, which includes high prices for owner-occupied housing, a heavily regulated rental market, and extended waiting times for social housing in major cities. The EU Commission's working paper urges Denmark to take measures to make the housing market more resilient and alleviate the difficulties faced by households in accessing affordable housing.

== Germany ==
Affordable housing in Germany, also known as social housing, refers to housing that is subsidized by the government to provide affordable rent to low-income households. Social housing is typically owned by the government or by non-profit organizations and is intended to provide decent, affordable housing for those who cannot afford market-rate housing. In Germany, social housing has a long history and is considered an important part of the country's social welfare system. After World War II, the government embarked on a massive social housing program to address the shortage of affordable housing. This program resulted in the construction of millions of units of social housing across the country.

Large rental areas refer to neighborhoods or districts in cities where the majority of the housing is owned by a single landlord or company and rented out to tenants. These areas are often characterized by uniformity in the design and construction of buildings, as well as a lack of diversity in the types of residents who live there. Germany has a long history of large rental areas, which can be traced back to the early 20th century. During this time, rapid urbanization and industrialization led to a housing shortage, particularly in urban areas. In response, large companies began to build housing complexes to meet the demand for affordable housing. One of the most famous examples of large rental areas in Germany is the "Gartenstadt" movement, which began in the early 1900s. The Gartenstadt Karlsruhe, or "the garden city," was a planned community that aimed to provide affordable housing for working-class families while also promoting a healthy, green lifestyle. The first Gartenstadt was built in Berlin in 1907, and soon similar communities were constructed in cities throughout Germany.

During the 1920s and 1930s, large rental areas continued to be built in Germany, often with the support of the government. However, this changed after World War II, when the government began to encourage individual home-ownership as a means of rebuilding the country. As a result, large rental areas fell out of favor, however they continue to provide affordable housing for many people.

Social housing in Germany is an important source of affordable housing, particularly in urban areas where rents are high. Eligibility for social housing is based on income and other factors, such as family size and disability status. In general, households that earn less than a certain amount are eligible for social housing, and rents are set at a percentage of the household's income. In recent years, there has been growing concern about the shortage of affordable housing in Germany, particularly in major cities like Berlin and Munich. The government has responded by increasing funding for social housing and introducing new programs to support the construction of affordable housing. However, demand for social housing continues to outstrip supply, and many low-income households still struggle to find affordable housing in Germany.

== India ==
In India, it is estimated that in 2009–10, approximately 32% of the population was living below the poverty line and there is a huge demand for affordable housing. The deficit in Urban housing is estimated at 18 million units most of which are amongst the economically weaker sections of society. Some developers are developing low cost and affordable housing for this population. The Government of India has taken up various initiatives for developing properties in low cost and affordable segments. They have also looked at PPP model for the development of these properties.

The Government of Haryana launched its affordable housing policy in 2013. This policy is intended to encourage the planning and completion of "Group Housing Projects" wherein apartments of pre-defined size are made available at pre-defined rates within a time-frame as prescribed under the present policy to ensure an increased supply of Affordable Housing in the urban areas of Haryana.

== Indonesia ==
Government-subsidized affordable homes in Indonesia are called Rumah Subsidi and affordable apartments are called Rusunawa. The Indonesian Ministry of Housing announced its commitment to increasing the accessibility of long-term housing and refining the housing finance system, as well as incorporating more local government and stakeholder involvement in housing and settlement development. This policy focus is also shown in the government's implementation of several low-income housing assistance schemes, including the 2003 National Movement for One Million Houses. The movement aimed to improve coordination and collaboration between local stakeholders in housing development and "improvements to the living environment," while also working to develop a housing market empowerment strategy that standardizes housing construction guidelines and public sector housing governance.

== Iran ==
Iran started the Iranian National Housing program in 2018.

Iran has a housing affordability crisis, particularly in urban areas where escalating property prices have outpaced average income levels. This disparity has made homeownership an unattainable goal for many citizens, with reports indicating that even modest homes in economically disadvantaged neighborhoods now cost no less than two billion tomans.

In response to this challenge, the Iranian government has initiated several large-scale affordable housing projects. One initiative is the National Housing Movement, which aims to construct millions of residential units for low and middle income families. For instance, in March 2025, 4,980 units were inaugurated in West Azarbaijan Province.

There is evidence of land underutilization, with reports indicating that the government retains vast expanses of land that could be utilized for housing development. Critics argue that this land hoarding exacerbates the housing crisis by limiting the availability of affordable housing options.

Additionally, urban development trends in cities like Tehran reveal a growing divide between luxury and affordable housing. The emergence of luxury glass apartments in affluent neighborhoods contrasts with the struggles of average citizens to secure basic housing, reflecting broader socioeconomic disparities within the country.

== Ireland ==
Affordable housing (Irish: tithíocht inacmhainne) schemes existed until 2011. First-time purchasers were offered the chance to buy newly constructed homes and apartments at prices significantly less than their market value. The schemes were replaced by three new schemes:

- Rebuilding Ireland Home Loan (Iasacht Tithíochta Atógáil Éireann): provides mortgages with reduced interest rates (2%–2.25%) to first-time buyers
- Affordable Purchase Scheme: local authorities provide state-owned land at reduced or no cost to developers to facilitate the building of affordable homes
- Affordable Rental Scheme: uses a "cost rental" model to supply low-rent accommodation while still ensuring a small profit for landlords

== Mali ==
Development Workshop, a Canadian and French NGO, has brought a real alternative to the inhabitants to accede to affordable housing that fights the environmental degradation and offers training and employment for many people who were under-employed or unemployed. The project has received many awards, such as the UN-Habitat-United Nations Human Settlements Programme award. One of the key aspects of the project is the introduction of a woodless construction and new techniques to build public buildings, offices, and simple shelters among other examples. This process increases the demand for skilled builders, and as a consequence training courses became necessary. The economic cost of the building decreases, and as a result over 1,000 woodless buildings had been built.

== Philippines ==
The first affordable housing projects in the Philippines was introduced by then-president Ferdinand Marcos in the 1970s. The Ministry of Human Settlements (now the Department of Human Settlements and Urban Development) established the Bagong Lipunan Improvement of Sites and Services or BLISS. These projects consisted of low-rise apartment buildings with 16 to 32 units each building. Since then, other affordable housing projects were also developed by the National Housing Authority (Philippines).

The government-owned Bases Conversion and Development Authority (BCDA) is currently developing New Clark City, a new metropolis designed to be "smart, green and disaster-resilient". New Clark City is envisioned to hold over 1.2M people and the BCDA will be building an affordable housing units for its workers.

== South Africa ==
Affordable housing in South Africa generally refers to homes catering to households earning low to moderate incomes. These programs are driven at the national, provincial, and municipal level.

The social democratic ANC government of South Africa's first President, Nelson Mandela, implemented the Reconstruction and Development Programme (RDP), a socio-economic policy, which oversaw many major advances in dealing with social matters in the country, including a lack of affordable housing.

The present day Government of South Africa still provides free houses to qualifying residents, under its Subsidized Housing program. Applications can be submitted via an individual's Provincial Department of Human Settlements or their Local Municipality. The waiting period is usually 2 years. When their new home is complete, the beneficiary will be registered on the government housing database.

Provinces and Metropolitan Municipalities (local governments of major cities) have their own initiatives to address affordable housing in the areas that fall under their jurisdiction. Notable among them are the programs facilitated by the governments of the Western Cape province and its capital, Cape Town.

=== Cape Town ===
The City of Cape Town allocates significant funding in its annual budgets towards affordable housing developments. The City defines affordable housing as residences catering to households earning an income of below R32,000 per month.

Numerous affordable housing developments have been approved in recent years. These include such housing located in or close to Cape Town CBD, the economic center of the city. Other, similar developments have been approved for suburban areas in Cape Town.

Cape Town's City Council is awaiting the release of national government-controlled land within the city's borders, which would unlock the development of around 100,000 units of affordable housing.

As of 2025, a total of 10 social housing estates have been built across Cape Town. All affordable housing built as of 2025 has been social housing, with gap housing and Open market affordable housing planned by the City.

== South Korea ==
In South Korea the public Korea Land & Housing Corporation has provided homes to 2.9 million households which is 15% of the national total of 19.56 million households. This includes 2.7 million newly-built public housing units and 1.03 million rental homes of which 260,000 were purchased or rented by the Land and Housing Corporation.

== Turkey ==
Housing Agency of Turkey (TOKİ) is responsible for construction of houses for lower income. Low income segment houses have longer payments, and generally equal to a month's rent. Owners are chosen by draw. Applications are limited to people without homes in the same state and limited by monthly income (5,500 TRY as of September 2020). TOKİ also constructs houses without application limits, however these have similar prices with market.

== United Kingdom ==
The British housing market in the late 1980s and early 1990s experienced an almost unprecedented set of changes and pressures. A combination of circumstances produced the crisis, including changes in demography, income distribution, housing supply and tenure, but financial deregulation was particularly important. Housing affordability became a significant policy issue when the impact on the normal functioning of the owner occupied market became severe and when macroeconomic feedback effects were perceived as serious. A number of specific policy changes resulted from this crisis, some of which may endure. Many of these revolve around the ability or otherwise of people to afford housing, whether as would-be buyers priced out of the boom, recent buyers losing their home through mortgage default or trapped by 'negative equity', or tenants affected by deregulation and much higher rent levels.

A 2013 investigation by The Bureau of Investigative Journalism found that the UK spent £1.88bn – enough to build 72,000 homes in London – on renting temporary accommodation in 12 of Britain's biggest cities over the preceding four years.

Research by Trust for London and the New Policy Institute found that London delivered 21,500 affordable in the three years up to 2015/16. This was 24% of all homes delivered during that period.

=== A tradition of social housing in the United Kingdom ===
The United Kingdom has a long tradition of promoting affordable social rented housing. This may be owned by local councils or housing associations. There are also a range of affordable home ownership options, including shared ownership (where a tenant rents part share in the property from a social landlord, and owns the remainder). The government has also attempted to promote the supply of affordable housing principally by using the land-use planning system to require that housing developers provide a proportion of either social or affordable housing within new developments. This approach is known in other countries with formal zoning systems as inclusionary zoning, whilst the current mechanism in the UK is through the use of a S.106 Agreement. In Scotland the equivalent is a Section 75 planning agreement. (Section 75 of the Town and Country Planning (Scotland) Act 1997)

=== Council houses ===
A high proportion of homes in the UK were previously council-owned, but the numbers have been reduced since the early 1980s due to initiatives of the Thatcher government that restricted council housing construction and provided financial and policy support to other forms of social housing. In 1980, the Conservative government of Margaret Thatcher introduced the Right to Buy scheme, offering council tenants the opportunity to purchase their housing at a discount of up to 60% (70% on leasehold homes such as flats). Alongside Right to Buy, council-owned stock was further diminished as properties were transferred to housing associations.

Council tenants in some instances have chosen to transfer management of the properties to arms-length non-profit organisations. The tenants still remained council tenants, and the housing stock still remained the property of the council. This change in management was encouraged by extra funding from central government to invest in the housing stock under the Decent Homes Programme. The program required council housing to be brought up to a set standard was combined with restrictions on the amounts that councils could borrow and led to an increase in such arms-length management organisations being set up. In some areas, significant numbers of council houses were demolished as part of urban regeneration programmes, due to the poor quality of stock, low levels of demand and social problems.

In rural areas where local wages are low and house prices are higher (especially in regions with holiday homes), there are special problems. Planning restrictions severely limit rural development, but if there is evidence of need then exception sites can be used for people with a local connection. This evidence is normally provided by a housing Needs survey carried out by a Rural Housing Enabler working for the local rural community council.

Housing associations are not-for-profit organisations with a history that goes back before the start of the 20th century. The number of homes under their ownership grew significantly from the 1980s as successive governments sought to make them the principal form of social housing, in preference to local authorities. Many of the homes previously under the ownership of local authorities have been transferred to newly established housing associations, including some of the largest in the country. Despite being not-for-profit organisations, housing association rents are typically higher than for council housing. Renting a home through a housing association can in some circumstances prove costlier than purchasing a similar property through a mortgage.

All major housing associations are registered with the Homes and Communities Agency who are responsible for the regulation of social housing from 1 April 2012. Housing associations that are registered were known as Registered Social Landlords from 1996, but in the Housing and Regeneration Act 2008 the official term became Registered Providers. The latter also covers council housing, and developers and other bodies that may receive grants for development. The Department for Communities and Local Government sets the policy for housing in England.

In Scotland policy is set by the Scottish Parliament; inspecting and regulating activities falls to the Scottish Housing Regulator. Social housing in Northern Ireland is regulated by the Northern Ireland Housing Executive, which was established to take on ownership of former council stock and prevent sectarian allocation of housing to people from one religion.

== United States ==
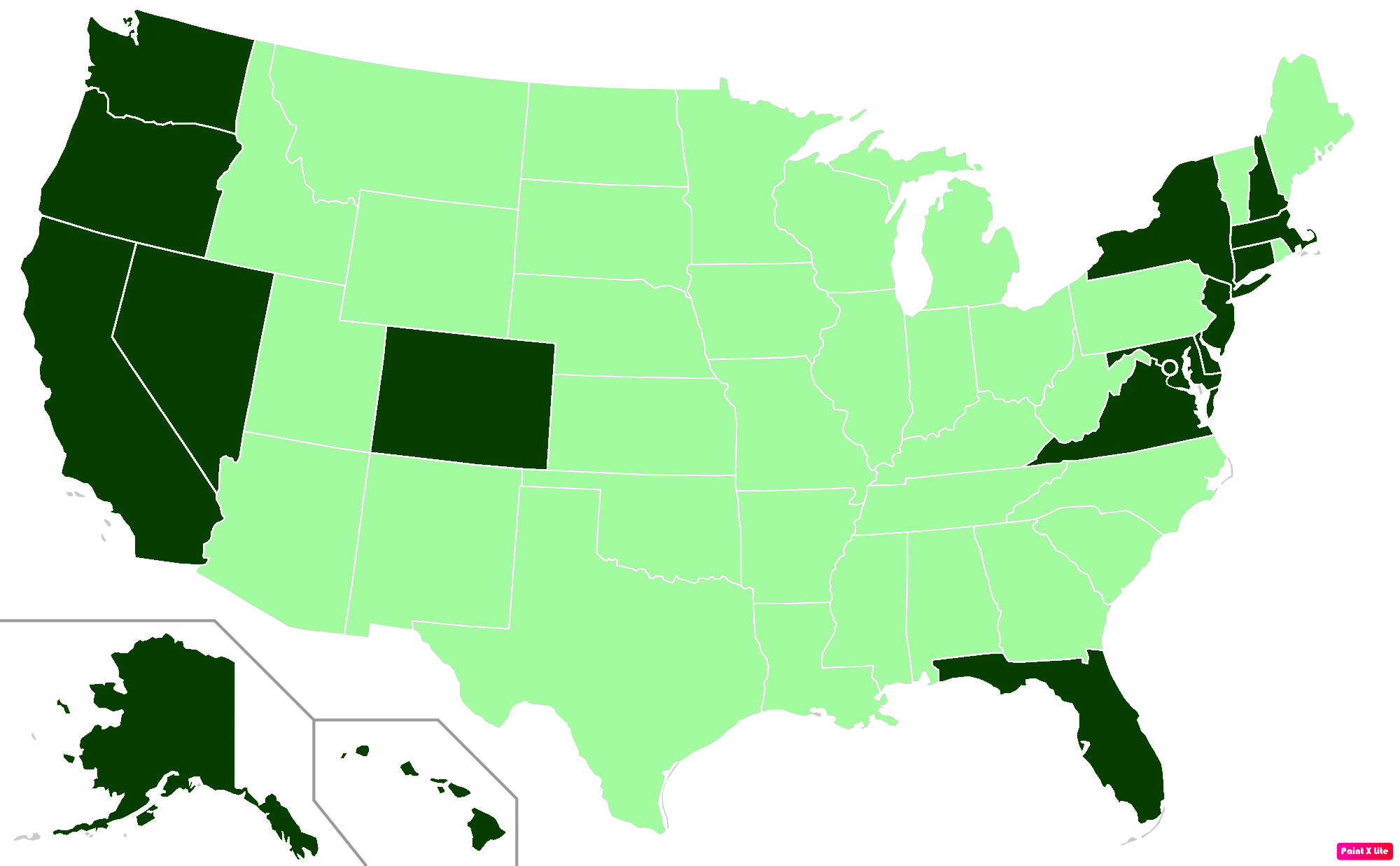
Median gross rent by state from 2015 to 2019 American Community Survey estimates published by the U.S. Census Bureau. States with median gross rents higher than the United States as a whole are in dark green.

In the U.S., households are commonly defined in terms of the amount of realized income they earn relative to the Area Median Income or AMI. Localized AMI figures are calculated annually based on a survey of comparably sized households within geographic ranges known as metropolitan statistical areas, as defined by the US Office of Management and Budget. For U.S. housing subsidies, households are categorized by federal law as follows:

- Moderate income households earn between 80% and 120% of AMI.
- Low income households earn between 50% and 80% of AMI.
- Very low income households earn no more than 50% of AMI.

Some states and cities in the United States operate a variety of affordable housing programs, including supportive housing programs, transitional housing programs and rent subsidies as part of public assistance programs. Local and state governments can adapt these income limits when administering local affordable housing programs; however, U.S. federal programs must adhere to the definitions above. For the Section 8 voucher program, the maximum household contribution to rent can be as high as 40% gross income.

=== Housing supply and price trends ===
The U.S. housing market experienced a sharp contraction in for-sale inventory during the COVID-19 pandemic, followed by a partial recovery. According to an analysis by the Pew Research Center using data from Realtor.com, there were more than 1.2 million active for-sale listings on local multiple listing services (MLS) on a typical day in September 2019. By September 2023, active listings had declined by 42.7% to approximately 702,000. Inventory rebounded in 2024, reaching about 941,000 active listings in September, a 34.0% increase from the previous year, though still below pre-pandemic levels.

The recovery in housing supply has been uneven across the country. In September 2024, 78.9% of the more than 900 local markets tracked by Realtor.com had fewer active listings than in September 2019, while 92.2% had more active listings than in September 2023.

During the same period, home prices continued to rise. The Federal Housing Finance Agency’s national House Price Index showed that single-family home prices were 57.8% higher in July 2024 than in July 2019. By comparison, the Consumer Price Index increased by 22.8% between September 2019 and September 2024, indicating that housing prices rose substantially faster than overall consumer inflation.

Distribution of U.S. Median Home Values, 2005

Comprehensive data for the most affordable and least affordable places in the U.S. is published each year by an affordable housing non-profit organization, the National Low Income Housing Coalition. The NLIHC promotes a guideline of 30% of household income as the upper limit of affordability. According to a 2012 National Low Income Housing Coalition report, in every community across the United States "rents are unaffordable to full-time working people."

However, by using an indicator, such as the Median Multiple indicator which rates affordability of housing by dividing the median house price by gross [before tax] annual median household income), without considering the extreme disparities between the incomes of high-net-worth individual (HNWI) and those in the lower quintiles, a distorted picture of real affordability is created. Using this indicator—which rates housing affordability on a scale of 0 to 5, with categories 3 and under affordable—in 2012, the United States overall market was considered 3 (affordable).

Since 1996, while incomes in the upper quintile increased, incomes in the lower quintile households decreased creating negative outcomes in housing affordability.

Before the real estate bubble of 2007, the median household paid $658 per month in total housing costs (Census 2002). A total of 20% of households were deemed to be living in unaffordable housing: Nine percent of all households are renters in unaffordable housing, and eleven percent of all households are homeowners with high housing costs.

In the 2000 U.S. census, the median homeowner with a mortgage (70% of homeowners and 48% of census respondents) spent $1,088 each month, or 21.7% of household income, on housing costs. The median homeowner without a mortgage (30% of all homeowners (80% of elderly homeowners) and 20% of respondents) spent $295 per month, or 10.5% of household income, on housing costs. Renters in 2001 (32% of respondents) spent $633 each month, or 29% of household income, on housing costs.

=== Federal subsidies and other forms of government housing assistance ===
The federal government in the U.S. provides subsidies to make housing more affordable. Financial assistance is provided for homeowners through the mortgage interest tax deduction and for lower income households through housing subsidy programs. In the 1970s the federal government spent similar amounts on tax reductions for homeowners as it did on subsidies for low-income housing. However, by 2005, tax reductions had risen to $120 billion per year, representing nearly 80 percent of all federal housing assistance. The Advisory Panel on Federal Tax Reform for President Bush proposed reducing the home mortgage interest deduction in a 2005 report.

Housing assistance from the federal government for lower income households can be divided into three parts:

- "Tenant based" subsidies given to an individual household, known as the Section 8 program
- "Project based" subsidies given to the owner of housing units that must be rented to lower income households at affordable rates, and
- Public Housing, which is usually owned and operated by the government. (Some public housing projects are managed by subcontracted private agencies.)

"Project based" subsidies are also known by their section of the U.S. Housing Act or the Housing Act of 1949, and include Section 8, Section 236, Section 221(d)(3), Section 202 for elderly households, Section 515 for rural renters, Section 514/516 for farmworkers and Section 811 for people with disabilities. There are also housing subsidies through the Section 8 program that are project based. The United States Department of Housing and Urban Development (HUD) and USDA Rural Development administer these programs. HUD and USDA Rural Development programs have ceased to produce large numbers of units since the 1980s. Since 1986, the Low-Income Housing Tax Credit program has been the primary federal program to produce affordable units; however, the housing produced in this program is less affordable than the former HUD programs.

=== Inclusionary housing development regulations ===
Another program is inclusionary housing—an ordinance that requires housing developers to reserve a percentage between 10 and 30% of housing units from new or rehabilitated projects to be rented or sold at a below market rate for low and moderate-income households.

One of the most unusual US public housing initiatives was the development of subsidized middle-class housing during the late New Deal (1940–42) under the auspices of the Mutual Ownership Defense Housing Division of the Federal Works Agency under the direction of Colonel Lawrence Westbrook. These eight projects were purchased by the residents after the Second World War and as of 2009 seven of the projects continue to operate as mutual housing corporations owned by their residents. These projects are among the very few definitive success stories in the history of the US public housing effort.

Governmental and quasi-governmental agencies that contribute to the work of ensuring the existence of a steady supply of affordable housing in the United States are the U.S. Department of Housing and Urban Development (HUD), USDA Rural Development, the Federal Home Loan Bank, Fannie Mae, and Freddie Mac. Housing Partnership Network is an umbrella organization of 100+ housing and community development nonprofits. Important private sector institutions worth consulting are the National Association of Home Builders, the National Affordable Housing Management Association (NAHMA), the Council for Affordable and Rural Housing (CARH) and the National Association of Realtors. Valuable research institutions with staff dedicated to the analysis of "affordable housing" includes: The Center for Housing Policy, Brookings Institution, the Urban Institute and the Joint Center for Housing Studies at Harvard University and the Furman Center for Real Estate and Urban Policy at New York University, and the Center on Budget and Policy Priorities. Several of these institutions (the Fannie Mae Foundation, Urban Institute, Brookings Institution Metropolitan Policy Program, Enterprise Community Partners, LISC, the Harvard Joint Center for Housing Studies, and others) partnered to create KnowledgePlex, an online information resource devoted to affordable housing and community development issues.

== See also ==
- Housing Affordability in Anglophone Countries
