= FHSA =

FHSA may refer to:

- Family health services authority, a former type of administrative organisation of the NHS in the United Kingdom
- First home saver account, Australian savings account abolished in 2015
- First Home Savings Account, Canadian savings account introduced in 2022
