= SHSC =

SHSC may refer to:

- Social Housing Services Corporation
- Sunnybrook Health Sciences Centre
- St Helena Secondary College
