= First Home Scheme =

Equity scheme by the Department of Housing in Ireland

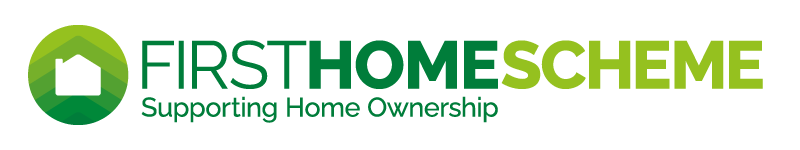

Agency overview
- Formed: 2022
- Jurisdiction: Ireland

The First Home Scheme (FHS) is a shared equity program launched in Ireland on 7 July 2022. It aims to help individuals and families looking to purchase a property by providing supplemental funding in the form of an equity share. The funding is used in addition to the deposit and mortgage, so that the potential homebuyer can afford the price of their home.

The scheme is a joint venture between the state and participating banks. Potential applications can apply for up to 30% of the cost of the home, in return for a percentage share in the property purchased. As of 2022, it was available to new homebuyers up until 2025, with the potential to extend this timeframe.

== Background ==
The First Home Scheme was announced by the Irish government in September 2021 as part of the "Housing for all Strategy". The scheme was established by the Department of Housing, Local Government and Heritage in conjunction with participating financial institutions.

The fund provides a percentage of the purchase price of the property in the form of an equity share, up to a specified amount. Homebuyers can apply for up to 30% of the cost of a new home, or up to 20% if they are also availing of the Help to Buy scheme. Property price ceilings per local authority area apply to eligible properties within the scheme, which include both houses and apartments. Property price ceilings are reviewed on a six-monthly basis to ensure that they reflect current house and apartment prices by local authority area. All, or part, of the equity share can be bought back by the homeowner at any time. While there is no obligation to pay off the equity, or associated service charges, the property owner's "estate" would have to pay if the owner died.

== Extensions ==
On 17 April 2023, the scheme was extended to include tenants seeking to purchase the home they are renting and who have been served a notice of termination. This is referred to as the Tenant Home Purchase Scheme.

In September 2023, the scheme was extended to include self-built homes.
