= Iranian National Housing =

- مسکن ملی
- Ministry: Money and Credit Council Supreme Housing Council
- Website: tem.mrud.ir

Iranian National Housing is a government program for support and development in Iranian cities of millions of housing units through 400 million toman loans mediated by state Minister of Roads and Urban Development provided through banks. It succeeded various Mehr Housing Projects. It started in 2018.

Citizens who register to purchase have a score based on their amount of money they have put in and then selected.

20-25 million Iranians live in slums.

As of June 2023 the program had a 23000 hectare allocated to its projects four times the amount of land allocated compared to Maskan Mehr.

In July 2023 Iranian president made a deadline ultimatum for Iranian banks refusing to offer the loans.

6 million authenticated people have requested to purchase condo units.

In October 2023 Minister of Road and Urban Development said the government would allocate $2 billion for projects.

== Statistics ==
Around one million new bank accounts were opened in Bank Maskan for people buying units from the projects.

Tehran province has secured 2 million meters for use of national housing project.

Forty thousand 25 meters units will be developed.

== Criticism ==
Because home and rent prices are high, it has been recommended that the government should develop houses below 40– 30 meters, despite 35 meters being required by Iranian cities.
