= Social Housing Services Corporation =

Former group of non-profits and co-ops

The Social Housing Services Corporation (SHSC) operated in the Province of Ontario, Canada between 2002 and 2012 to provide group services for non-profit and co-operative housing organizations following the provincial download of over 270,000 social housing units to local municipalities.

SHSC was created under the Social Housing Reform Act of 2000 and became operational in February 2002. The 15 member SHSC board was made up of provincial, municipal, non-profit and cooperative housing representatives. Its mandate was to provide Ontario housing providers identified in the Social Housing Reform Act with bulk purchasing programs in natural gas, insurance and investments as well as training and performance measure programs.

On January 1, 2012, under the Housing Services Act, SHSC became the Housing Services Corporation, continuing its core programs and retaining its governance structure with a new name.

== History ==
In 1997, the Government of Ontario announced that social housing programs administered by the provincial government (public housing, non-profit housing and rent supplements) would be devolved to the municipal level under an initiative called Local Services Realignment.

However, the Government determined that some services should continue to be delivered at a province-wide level to achieve economies of scale. These became SHSC's core programs. Participating in these programs was not voluntary or based on their market competitiveness. Under the Social Housing Reform Act, certain non-profit and cooperative housing providers were required to use these programs. They included group insurance, bulk gas purchasing and a capital reserves investment program. In its later years, SHSC offered an energy efficiency retrofit program that coordinated energy audits, expertise, funding, bulk purchasing of energy-efficient goods, training and education, and data evaluation. It also supported and developed independent housing-related research. With the exception of gas purchasing, these programs were delivered through three subsidiaries: SoHo Insurance, SHSC Financial and GLOBE (Green Light on a Better Environment).

In 2011, the Social Housing Reform Act was replaced by the Housing Services Act, which came into force on January 1, 2012. The Act afforded municipal service managers more flexibility to manage social housing at a local level and to build new affordable housing. The Act also turned SHSC into HSC (the Housing Services Corporation).

HSC continued to deliver the same programs mandated under the Social Housing Reform Act,. However HSC was afforded greater autonomy to design and develop its programs "to support the quality of life for social housing residents" and "the development of affordable housing" per the new legislation. On a practical level, the legislation also strengthened HSC's relationships with municipal service managers. With significant management changes in 2013, there were corresponding changes to the corporation and its subsidiaries.

== Subsidiaries ==
=== SHSC Financial Inc. ===
SHSC Financial Inc.(SHSC FI) managed Ontario's Social Housing Investment Program. This program was created as a result of a 1999 Auditor General report on the capital reserves of social housing providers. SHSC Financial utilized PH&N Investment Services to manage its program and was responsible for client services and education, as well as program oversight. Like the SHSC Board, it was governed by a cross section of Ontario housing sector representatives.

In 2014, HSC expanded the ownership of SHSC Financial to create a pan-Canadian investment entity for non-profit and cooperative housing providers, divesting itself of sixty percent of its subsidiary to the Cooperative Housing Federation of Canada, the Cooperative Housing Federation of British Columbia and the British Columbia Non-Profit Housing Association. SHSC Financial became Encasa Financial and the new board had representatives from the expanded group of owners.

=== SoHo Insurance Inc. ===
SoHo Insurance Inc. was an insurance brokerage created in late 2005 to develop insurance products specifically designed to address the needs of Ontario's social housing community. In early 2008, SoHo launched a tenant insurance program – a low-cost insurance option specifically for residents of social housing.

SoHo Insurance Inc. was led by a board of directors made up of representatives from the social housing sector, including municipal service managers, non-profit housing and cooperative housing.

In 2014 SoHo was renamed HSC Insurance Inc.. It subsequently transferred its broker functions relating to tenant insurance to Marsh Canada. HSC Insurance Inc. is a RIBO-licensed broker that collects premiums from the prescribed social housing providers and acts as sub-broker for the mandated insurance program. It also manages claims to HSC's mandated insurance program's Property Claims Trust Fund on behalf of HSC and acts as an administrator to provide tenant insurance for residents of social housing.

=== GLOBE (Green Light on a Better Environment) ===
In 2005, SHSC began to investigate the impact of rising utility costs and the opportunities to assist the affordable housing sector in responding to the challenges. SHSC was able win support from provincial agencies and utility companies to establish a pilot program – the Green Light Initiative. The pilot demonstrated a clear need in the sector to invest in conservation and for supports to implement conservation initiatives.

As a result, SHSC launched a subsidiary called GLOBE (Green Light on a Better Environment). GLOBE sought to connect social housing providers, municipal service managers, property managers, and social housing tenants with educational tools and services to reduce energy and water use, including the delivery of energy retrofit programs offered by Ontario utility companies.

HSC brought GLOBE's program/service offerings were brought in-house in 2014 and the subsidiary was dissolved in 2015.

== See also ==
- Affordable housing
- Public housing
- Economic impact of immigration to Canada
- Poverty in Canada
- Energy conservation
- Energy
- Housing
