= First home saver account =

2007 Australian Labor Party election policy

First Home Saver Accounts (FHSAs) were a 2007 election policy of the Australian Labor Party under the First Home Saver Account Act. They were available to Australians from 2008 to 2015.

== History ==
For each dollar contributed to a FHSA during a financial year, the government contributed 17 cents up a specified limit. This limit would increase through indexation. In 2010, Treasurer Wayne Swan announced changes to the operation of FHSA accounts. Previously, when a FHSA holder purchased a house, thus making them ineligible to hold a FHSA, the funds in their FSHA would be transferred to their superannuation account. Under the proposed changes, the Government would allow funds in a FHSA to be paid into an approved mortgage after the FHSA holder satisfied the four year rule. On 10 May 2011 it passed both houses, receiving royal assent on 25 May 2011. According to sub-clause 2(1) of the Bill, the changes to the FHSA Act became law on 26 May 2011.

In the December 2013 quarter, the Australian Prudential Regulation Authority website stated that there were 46,000 FHSAs containing A$521.5m.

== See also ==
- First Home Super Saving Scheme
