= October 2022 Australian federal budget =

Australian federal budget October 2022
2022–23 Australian Federal Budget - October
- Submitted to: House of Representatives
- Presented: 25 October 2022
- Parliament: 47th Parliament
- Government: Albanese government
- Party: Australian Labor Party
- Treasurer: Jim Chalmers
- Total revenue: A$607 billion
- Total expenditures: A$650 billion
- Surplus: A$22 billion
- Website: budget.gov.au

The October 2022 Australian federal budget was the federal budget to fund government services and operations. The budget was presented to the House of Representatives by Treasurer Jim Chalmers on 25 October 2022. It was the first budget to be handed down by the Australian Labor Party since their election to government at the 2022 federal election. It was the second budget to be handed down in 2022, with the preceding budget being delivered in March by the prior government.

== Background ==
The budget was handed down during a period of high inflation. The consumer price index had risen to 7.3% over the past year, the highest since June 1990.

Before the budget was delivered the Treasurer was cautioning the state of the global economy. He warned our key trading partners faced the risk of recession.

The budget featured a new set of well-being measures. The initiative provides the framework that measures and reports on the quality of life for Australians, beyond the indicators of financial prosperity. The plan is to introduce targets next year.

== Forecasts ==
Australia’s gross domestic product is expected to grow 3.25% this financial year, dropping to 1.5% in the following financial year. This is the lowest since the early 1990s recession, aside for the drop in growth during the pandemic.

=== Revenues ===
Total government revenue is $644 billion this financial year. Government revenues were $57.3 billion better than last predicted in the March budget. The cause is higher company taxes generated by resource exports. The increased price of energy is a windfall for energy exporters.

$720 million is expected to be raised after a "crackdown on large companies using related-party debts to artificially reduce their local profits and tax bills".

== Expenditure ==
The budget included a $6.2 billion plan to remove the limits to annual Child Care Subsidy (CCS) payments, effective from July 2022. The subsidy would be offered to families earning up to $530,000 annually. $531.6 million is being spent on government paid parental leave entitlements. The entitlement will expand from 20 weeks to 26 weeks in 2026-27.

$800 million has been allocated to spending on renewable energy projects. This includes cutting taxes on electric cars and building a national electric vehicle charging network and hydrogen refueling stations among other measures.

Foreign aid to the Pacific is seeing a boost of $375 million, bringing the total to $900 million.

$2.4 billion is to go towards improving internet speeds for 1.5 million homes and businesses on the National Broadband Network.

The maximum general co-payment for Pharmaceutical Benefits Scheme scripts is being reduced from $42.50 to $30 at a cost of $200 million.

$2.5 billion is to be spent over four years on improving aged care. Specifically funding is for an increase in the number of care minutes residents receive and the commitment to require aged care homes to have a registered nurse onsite 24/7 from 1 July 2023.

$170 million has been allocated to women’s safety. 500 frontline workers will support women and children experiencing family, domestic and sexual violence.

The Climate Change Authority is being funded, with $42.6 million allocated. The Australian Broadcasting Corporation is set to have its funding restored, costing $83.7 million over four years. The Australian Taxation Office’s tax avoidance taskforce is set to crack down on tax avoidance by multinationals and individuals.

The budget also provided a significant boost to vocational education. $922 million is being spent over five years to provide 480,000 fee-free Technical and Further Education places.

== Debt and deficit ==
The underlying cash balance for this financial year is forecast to be a $36.9 billion deficit. A structural deficit is expected to remain for the next decade. As of 14 October Australian government debt was $892.3 billion.

== Opposition and crossbench response ==
Opposition Leader Peter Dutton criticised the budget as a "missed opportunity". David Pocock was disappointed that fossil fuels were still being subsidised.

== Reception ==
The Chief Executive of the Australian Council for International Development praised the increases in foreign aid spending as critical and a strong step. The National Mental Health Commission welcomed the introduction of a set of well-being measures. The Australian Council of Social Service was extremely concerned for people on the lowest incomes. Amnesty International Australia praised funding for justice reinvestment programs to help keep children out of the criminal justice system.

== See also ==
- Economy of Australia
- Taxation in Australia
