= March 2022 Australian federal budget =

Australian federal budget 2022
2022–23 Australian Federal Budget
- Submitted: 29 March 2022
- Submitted by: Morrison government
- Submitted to: House of Representatives
- Country: Australia
- Parliament: 45th
- Party: Liberal/NationalCoalition
- Treasurer: Josh Frydenberg
- Total revenue: $547.6 billion
- Total expenditures: $628.5 billion
- Debt payment: $714.9 billion
- Deficit: $78 billion
- Website: budget.gov.au
- Notes: Surplus = receipts - payments - net Future Fund earnings. Italics are estimates in the budget

The March 2022 Australian federal budget was the federal budget to fund government services and operations. The budget was presented to the House of Representatives by Treasurer Josh Frydenberg on 29 March 2022. It was the ninth budget to be handed down by the Liberal/National Coalition since their election to government at the 2013 federal election, the fourth budget to be handed down by Frydenberg and the Morrison government and the last budget to be handed down by the Morrison government prior to the 2022 Australian federal election. It was the first of two federal budgets to be handed down in 2022; a second budget was delivered in October by the successive government.

== Background ==
Despite a surplus having been projected for 2023/24, the March 2022 budget predicted a deficit as result of increasing cost of living pressures imposed due to the ongoing COVID-19 pandemic.

== Forecasts ==
=== Revenues ===
Revenue was forecasted to be $547.6 billion for 2022–23.

== Expenditure ==
Total expenditure for 2022–23 was forecasted to be $628 billion.

== Debt and deficit ==
=== Deficit ===
The Budget underlying cash deficit for 2022/23 was expected to be $78 billion, falling $20.9 billion from 2021/22.

=== Debt ===
The Australian government's debt level was forecasted to be $977 billion for 2022–23, whilst net debt was forecasted to be $714.9 billion. Debt was forecasted to reach $1.16 trillion by the 2025/26 financial year.

== See also ==
- Australian government debt
- Economy of Australia
- Taxation in Australia
