= 2025 Australian federal budget =

Appropriation Bill (No. 1) 2025-2026
- Submitted to: House of Representatives
- Presented: 25 March 2025
- Passed: 29 October 2025
- Parliament: 47th Parliament of Australia
- Government: Albanese government
- Party: Australian Labor Party
- Treasurer: Jim Chalmers
- Total revenue: A$812.1 billion
- Total expenditures: A$777.3 billion
- Tax cuts: A$536 on average
- Deficit: A$22.3 billion
- Debt: Gross 33.2% of GDP (A$971.4 billion), Net 18.8% of GDP (A$550.0 billion)
- Website: budget.gov.au

An Australian federal budget was presented on 25 March 2025 by Treasurer Jim Chalmers. The budget dictated how the Australian Government would allocate an estimated A$785.7 billion across the various departments of the federal government and to the state and territory governments. It was the fourth federal budget handed down by the Labor Party since their victory in 2022 and the last to be handed down before the 2025 federal election in May.

== Prior announcements ==
Prior to the budget speech by the treasurer, certain policies were announced, including a return to deficits and further power bill relief worth $150 for every bill payer, as well as a boost to funding for Medicare bulk-billing services worth $8.5 billion, additional Medicare urgent-care clinics, cheaper medicines through the Pharmaceutical Benefits Scheme (PBS) with this policy measure worth $689 million, and a cut to HECS-HELP debts for students worth $500 million, creating a permanent free TAFE system.

Additionally, the government will spend $9.2 billion on social and affordable housing, an expansion of the government's help to buy scheme — in this scheme the government will part own your home with the option to buy back that equity — with the changes to be worth $800 million and the total policy measure to cost $6.3 billion, the activity test requirement for childcare to be abolished, $7.2 billion to go towards upgrading the Bruce Highway in Queensland, $2 billion for green aluminium, $2.4 billion on a support package for the Whyalla Steelworks that entered voluntary administration in February, a $1 billion boost to defence spending, $45 million for spy agencies, $272 million on Australian-made radar systems, $650 million for long-range missiles, $262 million for the infrastructure needed to support the development of the AUKUS nuclear submarines, a freeze to the draught beer excise for two years from August which will lose the budget about $200 million in tax revenue, $2.9 million for a yet-to-be announced response for the ACCC's report into the supermarket sector.

== Political impact ==
The 2025–26 budget was moved from May to March due to the imminence of the 2025 Australian federal election. There was speculation the election could have been held in April but that could not come to fruition due to the impacts of Cyclone Alfred.

=== Political response ===
The shadow treasurer of the opposition Coalition, Angus Taylor, stated that the Liberal and National parties will not support the tax cuts put forward in the budget measures.

In the opposition's budget reply held during the second reading debate of the appropriations bill revealed that the opposition plans to spend introduce a national gas plan to lower bills by creating a domestic reserve supply of gas which Peter Dutton said would lower prices by 10–20%, the Coalition would also reduce the fuel excise from 50 cents to 25 cents, the Coalition also reaffirmed its plans to cut immigration numbers, the Coalition would increase the amount that small businesses can claim on tax write-offs from $20,000 to $30,000 and that the Coalition would implement a previously announced policy that would allow small businesses making up to $10,000 to claim up to $20,000 on meal expenses, the Coalition said they would cut roles in the public sector, the Coalition will invest $9 billion in Medicare, they will also cap medicines at $25 following the government's announcement, the Coalition also plans to invest $400 million in mental health services.

Senator for the Australian Capital Territory (ACT) David Pocock stated that the budget failed to deliver adequate funding for services and infrastructure for the ACT.

Senator for Tasmania Jacqui Lambie stated that the tax cuts should not be going to politicians and wealthy people, following her criticism that previous cost-of-living relief, such as power bill subsidies, should be means-tested.

The Greens have proposed taxing profits of large corporations to pay for their plans to put dental and mental health care into Medicare, cap rent increases, lower mortgages, and take strong climate action.

=== Post-speech developments ===
Further to the Greens' announcements regarding the budget, they have announced that they would spend at least 1% of the budget on environmental measures, which would see the government spend an additional $17 billion.

On 26 March 2025, the tax cuts proposed in the budget passed both chambers of Parliament. The Coalition vowed to repeal these tax cuts if elected to office at the May election.

== Reactions ==
=== Economists ===
EY's chief economist, Charelle Murphy, and senior economists Paula Gadsby and Nicholas Hordern stated that they were disappointed not to see substantial funding for innovative practices in business or for encouraging competitive practices. They noted that there were cost-of-living relief measures at the expense of fiscal repair and business assistance.

Independent economist Saul Eslake stated that there are challenges to raising sufficient revenue but praised certain reforms, such as the decision to ban the use of non-compete clauses. He also criticised the outsized distribution of the GST to Western Australia.

=== Business ===
CPA Australia stated that the budget "lacks ambition and a thorough understanding of what business needs." Chief executive officer Chris Freeland further encouraged the government to cut red tape. He also said that the instant asset write-off should have been made permanent.

== Policies ==
The budget will:

- Ban non-compete agreements for low- and middle-income workers
- Cut student debt by 20% and increase fairness in the system
- Spend $784.6 million to make PBS scripts cost a maximum of $25 and subsidise new and affordable medicines with an investment of $1.8 billion
- Deliver $2.6 billion to increase award wages of aged care nurses
- Deliver $1.8 billion to extend energy bill relief to the end of the calendar year
- Invest $7.9 billion to make nine out of ten visits to the GP bulk billed by 2030 for 4,800 bulk-billed GPs
- Deliver a $1.8 billion funding boost to public hospitals
- Fund the creation of an additional 50 Medicare urgent care clinics
- Spend $662.6 on measures to ensure Australia has a large workforce of doctors and nurses
- Spend $792.9 million to deliver lower costs, more choices, and better healthcare for women
- Ban foreign buyers from purchasing existing houses for up to two years from 1 April 2025
- Spend $5 billion towards delivering a universal early childhood education and care system
- Guarantee eligibility for children to go to an early childhood education centre via a subsidised scheme
- Fully fund public schools
- Make free TAFE permanent
- Reform universities as per the agreed Universities Accord
- Further the government's future made in Australia policy with a further $3 billion in green metals production
- Expand the Clean Energy Finance Corporation with a $2 billion investment
- Provide $4 billion to address violence against women and drive economic equality
- Provide $842.6 million to support critical first nations services in remote communities of the Northern Territory
- Spend $432.8 million to assist people with a disability
- Deliver a tax cut worth $536 for most workers by reducing the tax bracket for these earners from 16% down to 15% from July 2026, with a further reduction in July 2027
- Spend $50 million to control grocery prices in remote first nations communities
- The first new PBS listings for oral contraceptive pills and menopausal hormone therapies
- 2,000 government-funded GP training places by 2028
- Spend $3.6 billion to fund a wage increase for the early childhood education and care workforce
- Respond to the final report of the royal commission into defence and veteran suicide
- Spend $291.6 million to deliver aged care reforms
- Spend $364.5 million to provide general support for disabled people and their carers
- Increase opportunities for first nations people to buy their own home
- Provide business coaching for First Nations women
- Spend $1.3 billion to support strong outcomes for First Nations communities
- Build on the government's $4 billion commitment to women's safety
- Spend $3.9 billion to allow those fleeing gender-based violence scenarios to seek legal help
- Expand the government's help-to-buy scheme
- Provide up to $10,000 for apprentices in eligible home construction occupations
- Deliver a 45% increase in rent assistance
- Provide $50 million to develop Australia's construction capabilities in modern construction methods
- Deliver 18,000 homes under rounds one and two of the housing Australia future fund
- Provide states and territories with $120 million to remove barriers to modular and prefabricated construction
- Revitalise competition policy with a $900 million national productivity fund
- Deliver $17.1 billion in infrastructure investments across Australia
- Deliver up to $3 billion to complete the national broadband network
- Ensure banking services remain in regional places
- Deliver $330 billion to help the Australian Defence Force
- Deliver $20 million to support a buy Australian campaign
- Deliver energy efficiency grants to small and medium-sized businesses
- Provide $1.2 billion to respond to the aftermath of Cyclone Alfred
- Deliver up to 13 weeks of income support
- Deliver payments upon the meeting of eligibility criteria
- Deliver $10,000 business continuity payments
- Provide 3.2 million to help emergency service workers with mental health support.

== Financial measures ==
=== Balance sheet ===
It was projected that the budget would result in a net deficit after three years of surpluses, with a predicted loss of A$42.1 billion.

The budget includes total government spending estimated to total A$785.7 billion.

=== Spending and revenue by category ===
The 2025-26 Budget Paper 1 provides a high-level overview of government spending and revenue projected from the budget.

Federal government spending by major category
Major category	Spending	Percentage of government spending
Social security and welfare	A$290.9 billion	37.0%
Health	A$124.8 billion	15.9%
General purpose inter-governmental transactions	A$99.9 billion	12.7%
Other	A$149.7 billion	19.1%
Defence	A$51.4 billion	6.6%
Education	A$54.0 billion	6.9%
General public services	A$31.4 billion	4.0%
Interest	A$23.9 billion	3.0%
Transport and communication	A$16.5 billion	2.1%
Fuel and energy	A$19.2 billion	2.4%

Federal government revenue by major category
Major category	Revenue	Percent of government revenue
Individuals and withholding tax	A$335.6 billion	47.1%
Company tax	A$141 billion	19.9%
Goods and services tax	A$92 billion	12.9%
Non-taxation revenue	A$52.6 billion	7.4%
Excise and customs duty	A$47.28 billion	6.6%
Other taxes	A$23 billion	3.2%
Superannuation fund taxes	A$19.8 billion	2.8%
