= 2022 Australian federal budget =

2022 Australian federal budget may refer to:

- March 2022 Australian federal budget, delivered during Scott Morrison's term as Prime Minister
- October 2022 Australian federal budget, deliver during Anthony Albanese's term as Prime Minister
