= 2006 Australian federal budget =

- Submitted: 16 May 2006
- Submitted to: Parliament of Australia
- Country: Australia
- Parliament: 41st
- Party: Liberal/National Coalition
- Treasurer: Peter Costello
- Surplus: A$10.08 billion
- Website: www.budget.gov.au/2006-07/
- ^{‡}Numbers in italics are projections.

The 2006 Australian federal budget for the Australian financial year ended 30 June 2007 was presented on 16 May 2006 by Peter Costello, the Treasurer of Australia in the Howard government.

The budget provided for an underlying cash surplus of $10.8 billion, the government's ninth surplus. The net government debt was zero in the 2006–07 year, the first time in three decades, from a peak of 18.5% of GDP ($96 billion) in 1995–96.

The budget included further personal tax reform including tax cuts worth $36.7 billion over four years. Major improvements to business taxation to encourage take‑up of new technology and to simplify taxes for small business. There was also a plan to dramatically simplify and streamline superannuation. Other key initiatives include $2.3 billion for road and rail infrastructure, including to upgrade key sections of the Hume, Bruce and Pacific highways more quickly, a $1.9 billion boost to funding for mental health services, and families, older Australians and carers were to receive more support.

== See also ==
- Economy of Australia
