= Australian government debt =

Amount owed by the Australian federal government

Throughout this article, the unqualified term "dollar" and the $ symbol refer to the Australian dollar.

| Fiscal year (30 June) | Gross debt (A$ billion) | Debt ceiling (A$ billion) | Debt as share of GDP |
|---|---|---|---|
| 2026 | 971.447 | —N/a | 33.1% |
| 2025 | 928.639 | —N/a | 33.4% |
| 2024 | 906.939 | —N/a | 33.8% |
| 2023 | 889.790 | —N/a | 34.5% |
| 2022 | 895.253 | —N/a | 38.3% |
| 2021 | 816.991 | —N/a | 39.1% |
| 2020 | 684.298 | —N/a | 34.4% |
| 2019 | 541.992 | —N/a | 27.7% |
| 2018 | 531.937 | —N/a | 28.8% |
| 2017 | 500.979 | —N/a | 28.4% |
| 2016 | 420.420 | —N/a | 25.3% |
| 2015 | 368.738 | —N/a | 22.6% |
| 2014 | 319.487 | —N/a | 19.9% |
| 2013 | 257.378 | 300 | 16.7% |
| 2012 | 233.976 | 300 | 15.5% |
| 2011 | 191.291 | 250 | 13.4% |
| 2010 | 147.133 | 200 | 11.2% |
| 2009 | 101.147 | 200 | 8.0% |
| 2008 | 55.442 | 75 | 4.7% |
| 2007 | 53.264 | 75 | 4.9% |
| 2006 | 54.070 | —N/a | 5.4% |
| Source: Commonwealth of Australia | | | Source: AoB |

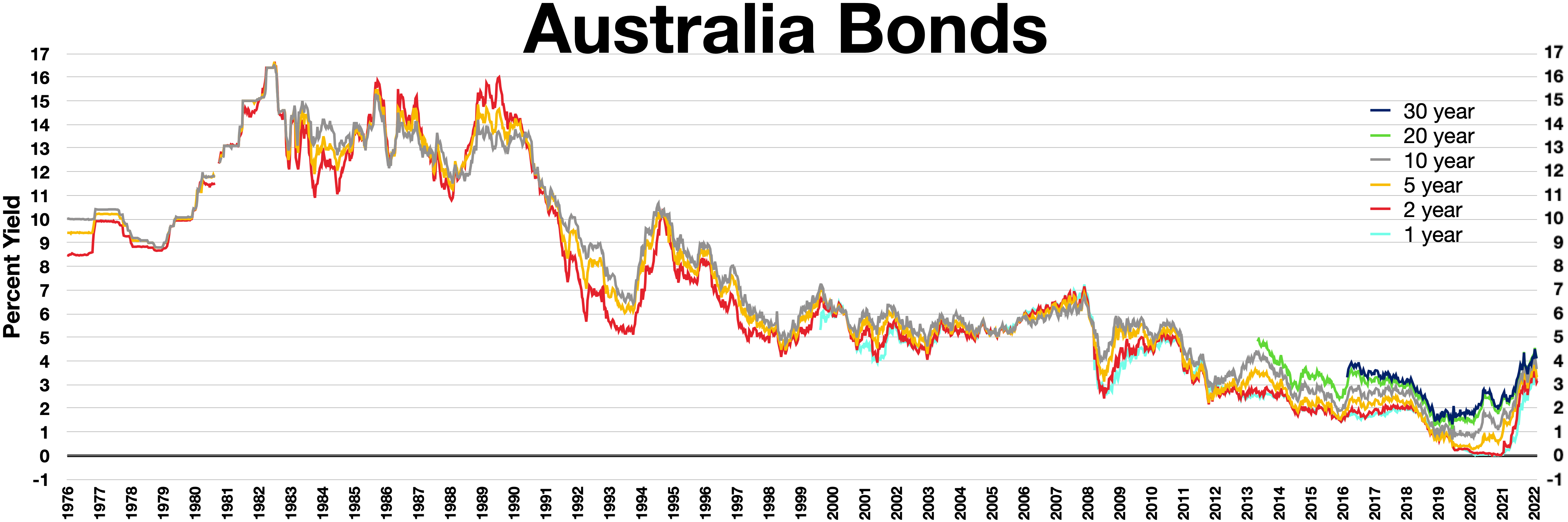
Australia bonds 30 year 20 year 10 year 5 year 2 year 1 year

The Australian government debt is the amount owed by the Australian federal government. The Australian Office of Financial Management, which is part of the Treasury Portfolio, is the agency which manages the government debt and does all the borrowing on behalf of the Australian government. Australian government borrowings are subject to limits and regulation by the Loan Council, unless the borrowing is for defence purposes or is a 'temporary' borrowing. Government debt and borrowings (and repayments) have national macroeconomic implications, and are also used as one of the tools available to the national government in the macroeconomic management of the national economy, enabling the government to create or dampen liquidity in financial markets, with flow on effects on the wider economy.

The net government debt is gross government debt less its financial assets, which is often expressed as a percentage of Gross Domestic Product (GDP) or debt-to-GDP ratio.

The government debt fluctuates from week to week depending on government receipts, general outlays and large-sum outlays. Australian government debt does not take into account government funds held in reserve within statutory authorities such as the Australian Government Future Fund, which at 30 September 2016 was valued at $122.8 billion, and the Reserve Bank of Australia. Nor is the net income of these statutory authorities taken into account. For example, the Future Fund net income in 2014–15 was $15.61 billion, which went directly into the fund's reserves. Also, guarantees offered by the government do not figure in the government debt level. For example, on 12 October 2008, in response to the 2008 financial crisis, the government offered to guarantee 100% of all bank deposits. This was subsequently reduced to a maximum of $1 million per customer per institution. From 1 February 2012, the guarantee was reduced to $250,000, and is ongoing.

Australia's net international investment liability position (government debt and private debt) was $1,028.5 billion at 31 December 2016, an increase of $5.4 billion (0.5%) on the liability position at 31 December 2016, according to the Australian Bureau of Statistics.

Australia's bond credit rating was rated AAA by all three major credit rating agencies as at May 2017. Around two-thirds of Australian government debt is held by non-resident investors – a share that has risen since 2009 and remains historically high.

== History ==
Before 1979, the government borrowed using individual cash loans and a mechanism known as the TAP system. Under this system, the government would set a fixed yield, and the private market would finance as much public debt at this yield as it saw fit. If the market did not finance all the debt on offer, then the treasury was able to borrow the outstanding amount from the Reserve Bank of Australia at a concessionary rate of 1%. This allowed the government to finance its debt without limitation. In 2000, the then Deputy Chief Executive Officer of the AOFM, Peter McCray, remarked that this system was "breaching what is today regarded as a central tenet of government financing—that the government fully fund itself in the market." He also remarked that this form of funding implied "reduced fiscal discipline" on the government's side, leading to likely inflationary consequences, as well as adverse implications to the private bond market.

The government retired the TAP system and introduced a tender system for short-term Treasury Notes in December 1979 and for Treasury Bonds in August 1982. Under this system, bonds are issued in an auction where primary dealers bid against each other. Australian macroeconomist Professor Bill Mitchell notes that there is still no risk of the government being unable to finance itself because the Australian government issues its own currency and can always meet any financial liabilities that are denominated in that currency. The Australian government can never run out of its own currency.

During the Howard government, large budget surpluses resulted in a reduction of treasury bonds on issue. In 2002, the government conducted a review into how this would affect bond market participants. Consistent with the outcome of the review, the government decided to continue issuing debt in the form of treasury bonds despite the surplus to maintain the bond market. This was justified on the basis that a declining bond market would have negative implications to those looking to hedge interest rate risk using bond futures, financial market diversity, and those who use bonds as investment vehicles. In balance with continued issuance of liabilities, it was decided the government would continue to accumulate financial assets, thus expanding its balance sheet and increasing the exposure to financial risks. However, it was decided that the benefits of maintaining a bond market outweighed such risks.

The Howard government also saw the unwinding of the federal government's foreign currency liabilities, ending a long period during which the government had a significant exposure to currency risk. The debt portfolio is now managed to a benchmark with a zero foreign currency component.

== Net government debt ==
Net government debt is defined by the International Monetary Fund as "gross debt minus financial assets corresponding to debt instruments". Financial assets corresponding to debt instruments include currency and deposits, debt securities and loans. In the context of the budget, general government sector net debt is equal to the sum of deposits held, government securities (at market value), loans and other borrowing, minus the sum of cash and deposits, advances paid and investments, loans and placements. The net debt to GDP ratio over time is influenced by a government surplus/deficit or due to growth of GDP and inflation, as well as movements in the market value of government securities which may in turn be influenced by movements in general interest rates and currency values.

The net government debt was negative (the Australian government had net positive bond holdings) in the 2006–07 year for the first time in three decades, from an original peak of 18.5% of GDP ($96 billion) in 1995–96. The reduction in net debt is attributable to the consistent budget surpluses in the mid-2000s.

Net and Gross Debt from 1971-2025
| Fiscal year (30 June) | Gross debt (A$ billion) | Gross Debt as share of GDP | Net Debt (A$ billion) | Net Debt as share of GDP |
|---|---|---|---|---|
| 2026 | 971.447 | 33.1% | TBD | TBD |
| 2025 | 928.639 | 33.4% | 532.346 | 19.2% |
| 2024 | 906.939 | 33.8% | 491.469 | 18.3% |
| 2023 | 889.790 | 34.5% | 491.013 | 19.1% |
| 2022 | 895.253 | 38.3% | 515.650 | 22.1% |
| 2021 | 816.991 | 39.1% | 592.221 | 28.3% |
| 2020 | 684.298 | 34.4% | 491.217 | 24.7% |
| 2019 | 541.992 | 27.7% | 373.566 | 19.1% |
| 2018 | 531.937 | 28.8% | 341.961 | 18.5% |
| 2017 | 500.979 | 28.4% | 322.320 | 18.3% |
| 2016 | 420.420 | 25.3% | 303.467 | 18.2% |
| 2015 | 368.738 | 22.6% | 245.817 | 15.1% |
| 2014 | 319.487 | 19.9% | 209.559 | 13.0% |
| 2013 | 257.378 | 16.7% | 159.594 | 10.3% |
| 2012 | 233.976 | 15.5% | 153.443 | 10.2% |
| 2011 | 191.291 | 13.4% | 90.660 | 6.4% |
| 2010 | 147.133 | 11.2% | 47.874 | 3.7% |
| 2009 | 101.147 | 8.0% | −11.285 | -0.9% |
| 2008 | 55.442 | 4.7% | −39.958 | -3.4% |
| 2007 | 53.264 | 4.9% | −24.288 | -2.2% |
| 2006 | 54.070 | 5.4% | 0.331 | 0.0% |
| 2005 | 55.025 | 5.9% | 15.604 | 1.7% |
| 2004 | 54.750 | 6.3% | 26.995 | 3.1% |
| 2003 | 57.435 | 7.1% | 33.403 | 4.2% |
| 2002 | 63.004 | 8.3% | 42.263 | 5.6% |
| 2001 | 66.403 | 9.4% | 46.802 | 5.6% |
| 2000 | 75.536 | 11.4% | 57.661 | 8.7% |
| 1999 | 85.331 | 13.7% | 72.065 | 11.6% |
| 1998 | 93.664 | 15.9% | 82.935 | 14.1% |
| 1997 | 111.067 | 19.9% | 96.281 | 17.3% |
| 1996 | 110.166 | 20.8% | 95.831 | 18.1% |
| 1995 | 105.466 | 21.2% | 83.492 | 16.8% |
| 1994 | 90.889 | 19.5% | 70.223 | 15.0% |
| 1993 | 76.509 | 17.2% | 55.218 | 12.4% |
| 1992 | 58.826 | 13.9% | 31.041 | 7.3% |
| 1991 | 48.723 | 11.7% | 16.915 | 4.1% |
| 1990 | 48.723 | 11.9% | 16.123 | 4.0% |
| 1989 | 56.854 | 15.4% | 21.981 | 6.0% |
| 1988 | 62.794 | 19.3% | 27.344 | 8.4% |
| 1987 | 67.172 | 23.4% | 29.136 | 6.0% |
| 1986 | 63.089 | 24.2% | 26.889 | 10.3% |
| 1985 | 54.420 | 23.1% | 21.896 | 9.3% |
| 1984 | 45.437 | 21.2% | 16.015 | 7.5% |
| 1983 | 37.071 | 21.2% | 9.151 | 4.8% |
| 1982 | 31.060 | 17.6% | 5.919 | 3.4% |
| 1981 | 30.189 | 19.8% | 6.356 | 4.2% |
| 1980 | 29.321 | 21.8% | 6.244 | 4.6% |
| 1979 | 28.120 | 23.6% | 4.983 | 4.2% |
| 1978 | 23.957 | 21.6% | 2.896 | 2.8% |
| 1977 | 20.845 | 21.6% | 0.898 | 0.9% |
| 1976 | 17.940 | 21.5% | −0.341 | -0.4% |
| 1975 | 14.785 | 20.7% | −1.901 | -2.7% |
| 1974 | 12.809 | 21.2% | −1.851 | -3.1% |
| 1973 | 12.217 | 24.5% | −0.790 | -1.6% |
| 1972 | 12.490 | 25.8% | −0.496 | -1.1% |
| 1971 | 10.887 | 26.9% | 0.344 | 0.9% |
Source: Archive of Budgets

== Latest budget forecasts ==
The federal budget is the main mechanism that determines the government's net debt position from one period to the next. A surplus (revenue is greater than expenses) allows the government to pay down its debt while a deficit (expenses are greater than revenue) requires the government to issue more debt to cover the shortfall. The Mid-Year Economic and Fiscal Outlook (MYEFO) for the 2025 Australian federal budget forecast that gross debt would reach $993 billion by the end of the 2025–26 fiscal year.

== Debt ceiling ==
A debt ceiling on how much the Australian government could borrow existed between 2007 and 2013.

The statutory limit was created in 2007 by the Rudd government and set at $75 billion. It was increased in 2009 to $200 billion, $250 billion in 2011 and $300 billion in May 2012. In November 2013, treasurer Joe Hockey requested Parliament's approval for an increase in the debt limit from $300 billion to $500 billion, saying that the limit would be exhausted by mid-December 2013. With the support of the Greens, the Abbott government repealed the debt ceiling over the opposition of the Labor Party.

== See also ==
- Government budget
- List of sovereign states by public debt
- Taxation in Australia
