= Australia and the World Bank =

World Bank logo

According to the Department of the Treasury ("The Treasury") of the Australian Government, the World Bank is the single "largest multilateral partner of Australia". Australian membership in the World Bank Group (WBG) is motivated by both 1) efforts to aid and assist the developing nations of the world and 2) to promote Australian regional interests throughout the East Asian, Southeast Asian, and greater Oceania regions. Examples of this include the multiple projects co-financed by Australia and the World Bank Group in the East Asian and Pacific regions that include the development of "infrastructure, health, education, and private sector development". Australian membership has led to countless successful foreign aid and development projects totaling hundreds of millions; in 2012-13 alone, Australia provided close to $552.6 million to the World Bank Group.

== Introduction ==
According to the Department of Foreign Affairs and Trade (DFAT), Australian foreign aid and World Bank Group contributions has led to achievements in three major areas concerning Growth, Inclusiveness, and Sustainability & Resilience. Australian and World Bank Group efforts have resulted in both economic development and urban development in the Growth sector, education, sustainable development, and welfare program development in the Inclusiveness sector, and other successful projects in the Sustainability & Resilience sector that include environmental protection. Among the five organizations of the World Bank Group, Australia maintains an especially close partnership with the International Development Association (IDA), as Australia and the IDA share similar perspectives on global aid and development projects ranging from "aid program priorities, promoting the private sector development, boosting female economic empowerment, effective governance, supporting fragile states, and tackling climate change".

== Australia & The World Bank Group Partnership ==
=== Regional Interests ===
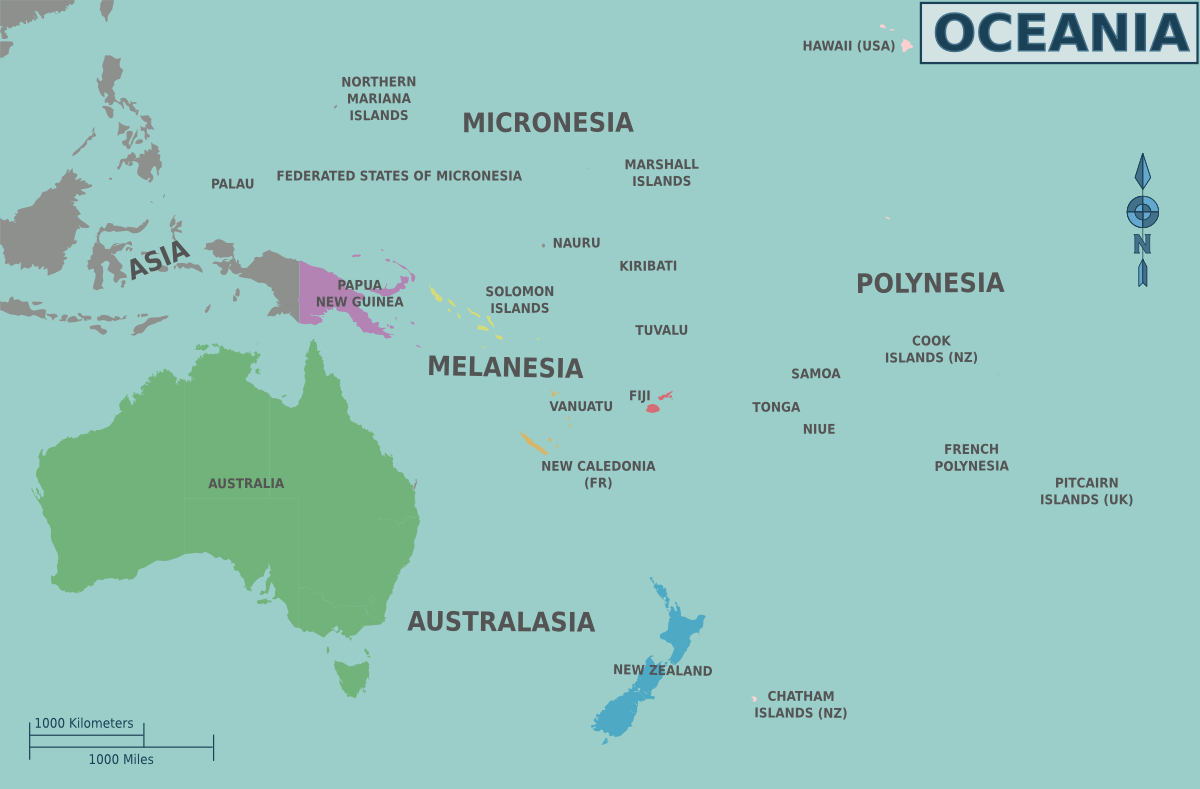
A map of the region of Oceania including the four subregions of Australasia, Melanesia, Micronesia, and Polynesia in the Pacific Ocean.

This map represents the Indo-Pacific biogeographic region.

Australia is a continental-nation located in the heart of the Indo-Pacific region, which includes East Asia, Southeast Asia, and Oceania (including Micronesia, Australasia, Melanesia, and Polynesia), and is among that of the wealthiest, and potentially most influential, nations in the region. Being so, Australia has the potential to assert great influence over the region, and thus has many interests and priorities regarding the region. Australian contributions to the World Bank Group, as close as the partnership is between the two, is primarily motivated by Australian interests and priorities in the Indo-Pacific region. Through Australian World Bank Group membership and contributions, Australia is able to promote and influence World Bank Group development, aid, and project policies and priorities to focus more on that of the Indo-Pacific region, allowing for more economic development and growth throughout the region.

=== Australian Partnership with the International Development Association ===
The Australian-IDA partnership is highlighted by the contributions made by the Australian Government towards IDA18 replenishments. IDA18 replenishments is a $774.45 million Australian dollar global, but primarily Pacific regional, effort aimed at increasing the value of currency in the region, increasing regional economic development and aid to benefit growth and infrastructure, increasing sustainable development, and other mutual projects that support both Australian regional interests and the World Bank Group agenda over the course of 9 nine years.

=== Contributions & Donations ===
Between 1994 and 2013, Australia contributed 134 donations towards The World Bank Group and their funds, of which include thirteen funds across six different sectors and themes. These contributions range from as little as $12,904.67(USD) to as much as $62,287,176.00. Below is a table of Australian contributions towards World Bank funds and their corresponding World Bank sectors between 1994 and 2013, according to the World Bank date provided in their Contributions to FIF (Financial Intermediary Funds) - Australia as of 2013.

Australian World Bank Group Funds Contributions (with Sectors) Between 1994 and 2013
| Funds | Sector |
|---|---|
| AgResults | Agriculture & Food Security |
| CGIAR Fund (Consultative Group for International Agricultural Research) | Agriculture & Food Security |
| Global Agriculture and Food Security Program | Agriculture & Food Security |
| Global Partnership for Education Fund | Education |
| Clean Technology Fund | Environment/Climate Change |
| Global Environment Facility | Environment/Climate Change |
| Green Climate Fund Trust Fund | Environment/Climate Change |
| Strategic Climate Fund | Environment/Climate Change |
| Trust Fund for the Least Developed Countries Fund for Climate Change | Environment/Climate Change |
| International Finance Facility for Immunization/GFA | Health |
| The Global Fund to Fight AIDs, Tuberculosis, and Malaria | Health |
| Haiti Reconstruction Fund | Natural Disasters |
| Debt Relief Trust Fund | Other |

Commonwealth Bank logo

== Commonwealth Bank of Australia & The World Bank Group ==
In 2018, the Commonwealth Bank of Australia (CBA) announced the release of a new bond sales technology designed to improve the efficiency and effectiveness of the World Bank Group bond sales management, oversight, and administration by utilizing blockchain technology and cryptocurrency, it was called – "bond-i". Bond-i stands for Blockchain Operated New Debt Instrument, and is solely managed and pioneered by CBA itself. While there have been previous, private blockchain bond projects, Bond-i is the first global, public, bond sales processing system to be developed wholly and completely from blockchain and cryptocurrency technology. As well as the first to be created, managed, and in which bond trade activities and actions are recorded using distributed ledger technology. This is all in efforts to relieve the outdated documented process of bond trading and issuance, allowing for a more effective, efficient, and economic trade process that will, in turn, increase the speed of trades while simultaneously decreasing the costs spent in processing these trades and bonds.

The bond was spearhead by CBA, through investments from King & Wood Mallesons, Mark-it, Microsoft and Toronto Dominion Securities, in efforts to simplify "raising capital and trading securities, improve operational efficiencies, and enhance regulatory oversight". Although Bond-i utilizes blockchain and distributed ledger technologies, the currencies of these bond exchanges is neither in cryptocurrency nor in bitcoin, but instead in the Australia dollar., partly because the Australian dollar is among the most highly traded currencies in the world.

== World Bank Group Regional Climate Change Activism ==
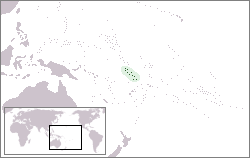
The nation of Tuvalu in respects to Polynesia and greater Oceania. Tuvalu was one of the first islands to be affected.

A map of the Republic of Kiribati located in Polynesia of the Oceania region. Kiribati was one of the first islands to be affected by climate change and global warming.

In 2017, the World Bank Group in their policy paper "PacificPossible" argued and advocated for both Australia and New Zealand to allow open migration to Pacific Islanders who were and are threatened by the global disaster of climate change. Numerous islands in the Pacific either have been engulfed, or are soon to be engulfed, by the Pacific Ocean due to the rising seas from climate change and global warming. The World Bank Group argued that allowing mass and open migration would not only be a humanitarian effort that would prevent a forced migration of Pacific Islanders in the future as a result of climate change, but the open access would also significantly boost both Australian and New Zealand economies. This economic theory was further supported by Australian thinktanks and multiple Australian research institutes.

In a Lowy Institute published report titled "The Development Benefits of Expanding Pacific Access to Australia's Labor Market", Leon Berkelmans and Jonathan Pryke present how allowing mass, open and free migration of Pacific island civilians to Australia would be both extremely beneficial towards the region but also beneficial towards the Australian economy as well. First, Berkelmans and Pryke proposed two avenues of mass, open and free migration: 1) the uncapped model and 2) the capped model. The uncapped model would call for Australia to establish a new special visa category in which there would not be a limit as to the number of civilians migrating to Australia. Through this model, it is projected that Australia would annually admit 900,000 immigrants, which would total to about 6.04 million by the year 2040. It should not be either assumed or misunderstood that the uncapped model either suggests or calls for unregulated and uncontrolled migration, the Pacific island civilians would still be subject to immigration tests, such as that of health and character tests. Next, would be the capped model, which would allow for more Australian Government oversight and regulation of the immigration process. This model projects that Australia would annually admit 215,000 immigrants each year, which would total to about 5.16 million by the 2040.

Per Berkelmans and Pryke, one of the more significant and notable of the anticipated benefits for Australian open mass and free migration would be that of increased annual incomes for individuals and households, as Australian regional aid to the Indo-Pacific and Oceania regions was $600 million (2005 PPP adjusted US$). They further noted that should these Pacific island civilians be allowed to immigrate and work in Australia, the combined annual income increases is projected to be $25 billion (2005 PPP adjusted US$), 40 times that of the Australian regional aid program budget.

Not only has it been suggested that opening free and mass migration be beneficial for the Pacific island civilians, but it has been suggested that these civilians, a majority of which are low-skilled, low and uneducated individuals, would be able to fill the voids in the Australia labor force shortages, especially in low-skilled professions. However, one of the detriments to this mass, open and free migration is that it would significantly undermine the Australian immigration initiative of attracting and admitting skilled workers to boost the Australian economy and improve the society and nation in general. Also, it is suggested that if so many Pacific island civilians emigrated from their homelands, their nations would be left worse off due to labor force shortages and declining economies, consequently.

Despite the presented projections and proposals, neither governments have acted upon The World Bank PacificPossible. Instead, have both governments have instead reasserted their respective global climate change and environmental protection agendas, interests, and priorities. In a comment by the DFAT Australian Minister for Foreign Affairs Julie Bishop, the Madam Minister stated that "Australia believes that the best response to climate change impacts, where feasible, is effective adaptation and well-supported internal relocation rather than resettlement."
