= Green metals =

Metals used in clean energy applications

Green metals is a term used to describe a set of metals that are utilized in clean energy applications and can help achieve net zero emissions targets. These metals include copper, nickel, silver, zinc, cobalt, neodymium, graphite, lithium, manganese, and molybdenum.

== Uses ==
Copper is used in technologies such as wind, solar, hydro, nuclear, and geothermal, as well as in electric vehicles and batteries. Manganese and molybdenum play roles in wind, hydro, and geothermal energy generation.

Aluminum and steel are components of panels and turbines. Copper is utilized in various items, including cables and vehicles. Cobalt, lithium, and nickel are used in components of EV battery cathodes, with graphite serving as the primary anode material. Neodymium, a magnetic rare earth metal, is used in certain EV motors and turbine generators.
