= Economy of Australia =

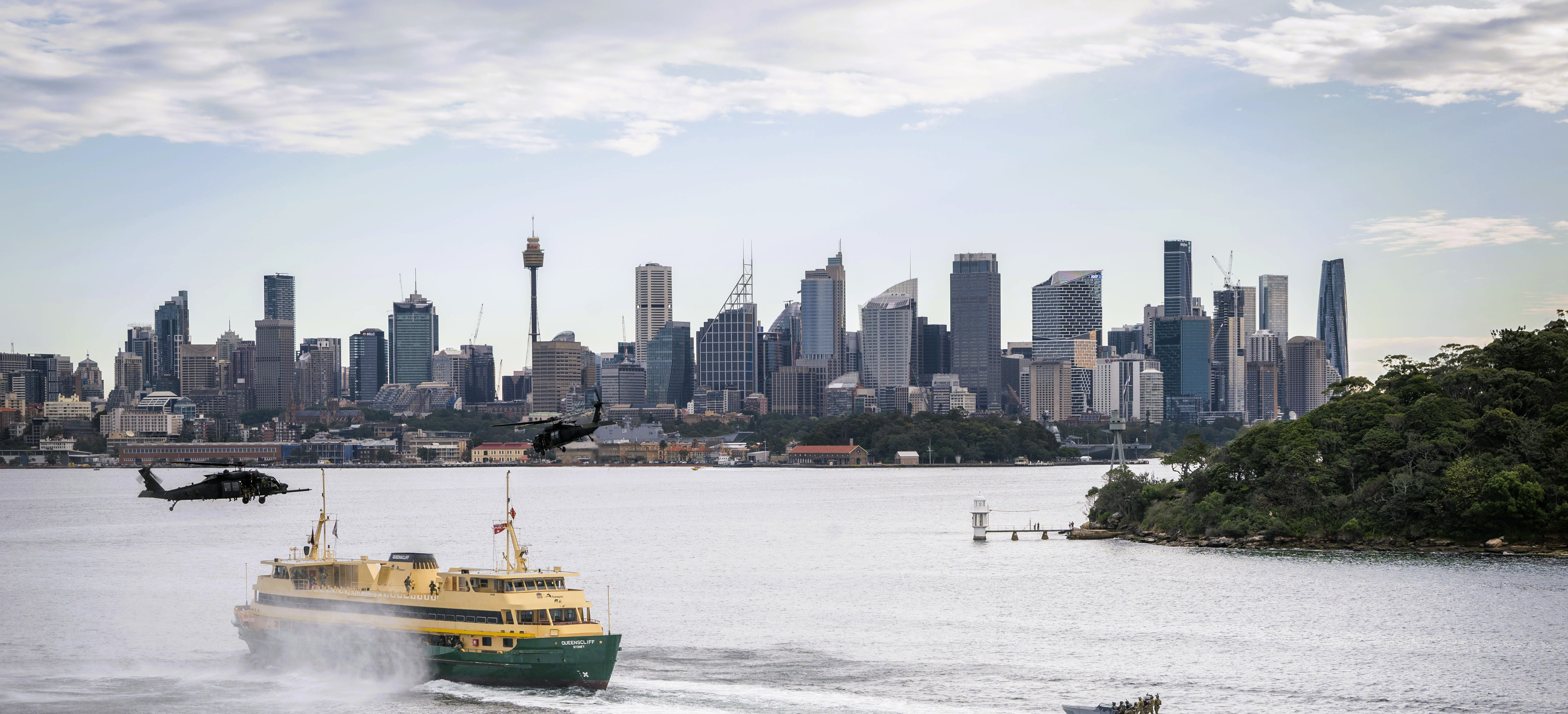
- Sydney's central business district is Australia's largest financial and business services hub.
- Currency: Australian Dollar (AUD)
- Fiscal year: 1 July – 30 June
- Trade organisations: APEC, CPTPP, G20, OECD, WTO, RCEP
- Country group: Advanced economy; High-income economy; Welfare state

Statistics
- Population: ▲27,466,749 (November 2024)
- GDP: ▲$1.950 trillion (nominal; 2026); ▲$2.060 trillion (PPP; 2025)
- GDP rank: 12th (nominal, 2026); 22nd (PPP, 2025)
- GDP growth: 1.6% (2025)
- GDP per capita: ▲$69,360 (nominal; 2026); ▲$73,360 (PPP; 2026)
- GDP per capita rank: 13th (nominal, 2025); 26th (PPP, 2025)
- GDP per capita growth: -0.6% (2024)
- GDP by sector: Services: 62.7%; Construction: 7.4%; Mining: 5.8%; Manufacturing: 5.8%; Agriculture: 2.8% (2017)
- Inflation (CPI): ▲3.8% (December 2025)
- Population below national poverty line: 13.4% (2020)
- Gini coefficient: ▼33.0 medium (2021)
- Human Development Index: ▼0.946 very high (2022) (10th); ▼0.860 very high IHDI (14th) (2022)
- Corruption Perceptions Index: ▲77 out of 100 points (2024, 10th rank)
- Labour force: ▲14.5 million (September 2024); ▲77.6% employment rate (Q3-2023)
- Labour force by occupation: Services: 78.8%; Construction: 9.2%; Manufacturing: 7.5%; Agriculture: 2.5%; Mining: 1.9% (2017)
- Unemployment: 4.3% (March 2026); ▼656.3 thousand unemployed (March 2026); ▼10.1% youth unemployment (March 2026; 15 to 24 year-olds)
- Average gross salary: A$7,890 / $5,454.58 PPP monthly (2022)
- Average net salary: A$6,076 / $4,200.25 PPP monthly (2022)
- Main industries: Financial and insurance services; Construction; Healthcare and social assistance; Mining; Professional, scientific and technical services; Manufacturing

External
- Exports: A$644.4 billion (2024)
- Export goods: Iron ore, wine, coal, natural gas, gold, aluminium, beef, crude petroleum, copper, meat (non-beef)
- Main export partners: China 30.4%; Japan 11.7%; South Korea 6.5%; United States 6.2%; India 5.5%
- Imports: A$614.1 billion (2024)
- Import goods: Petroleum, cars, telecom equipment and parts, goods vehicles, computers, medicaments, gold, civil engineering equipment, furniture
- Main import partners: China 18.8%; United States 15.2%; Japan 5.2%; South Korea 4.2%; Thailand 3.9%
- FDI stock: Inward: $682.9 billion; Outward: $491.0 billion; (UNCTAD 2018)
- Current account: ▲ A$14.1 billion (2022)
- Gross external debt: ▼US$2.095 trillion (Q1, 2019)

Public finance
- Government debt: 66.4% of GDP (October 2021)
- Foreign reserves: $66.58 billion (31 December 2017 est.)
- Budget balance: −0.2% (of GDP) (2019)
- Revenue: A$668.1 billion (2023)
- Spending: A$682.1 billion (2023)
- Economic aid: donor: ODA, $4.09 billion (2022)
- Credit rating: Standard & Poor's: AAA; Outlook: Stable; Moody's: AAA; Outlook: Stable; Fitch: AAA; Outlook: Stable
- All values, unless otherwise stated, are in US dollars.

Australia has a highly developed mixed economy. As of 2026, Australia was the 12th-largest national economy by nominal GDP (gross domestic product), the 22nd-largest by PPP-adjusted GDP, and was the 21st-largest goods exporter and 24th-largest goods importer. Australia took the record for the longest run of uninterrupted GDP growth in the developed world with the March 2017 financial quarter. It was the 103rd quarter and the 26th year since the country had a technical recession. (Note: A technical recession being defined as two consecutive quarters of negative economic growth) As of June 2021, the country's GDP was estimated at $1.98 trillion.

The Australian economy is dominated by its service sector, which in 2017 comprised 62.7% of the GDP and employed 78.8% of the labour force. At the height of the mining boom in 2009–10, the total value-added of the mining industry was 8.4% of GDP. Despite the recent decline in the mining sector, the Australian economy has remained resilient and stable and did not experience a recession from 1991 until 2020. Among OECD members, Australia has a highly efficient and strong social security system, which comprises roughly 25% of GDP. Also among OECD members, Australia has had the most severe increases in cost of living relative to wage growth since the COVID-19 pandemic, along with Finland and New Zealand.

The Australian Securities Exchange in Sydney is the 16th-largest stock exchange in the world in terms of domestic market capitalisation and has one of the largest interest rate derivatives markets in the Asia-Pacific region. Some of Australia's largest companies include Commonwealth Bank, BHP, CSL, Westpac, National Australia Bank, ANZ, Fortescue, Wesfarmers, Macquarie Group, Woolworths Group, Rio Tinto, Telstra, Woodside Energy and Transurban. The currency of Australia and its territories is the Australian dollar, which it shares with several Pacific nation states.

Australia's economy is strongly intertwined with the countries of East and Southeast Asia, also known as ASEAN Plus Three (APT), accounting for about 64% of exports in 2016. China in particular is Australia's main export and import partner by a wide margin. Australia is a member of the APEC, G20, OECD and WTO. The country has also entered into free trade agreements with ASEAN, Canada, Chile, China, South Korea, Malaysia, New Zealand, Peru, Japan, Singapore, Thailand and the United States. The ANZCERTA agreement with New Zealand has greatly increased integration with the economy of New Zealand.

== History ==
=== 20th century ===
Australia's average GDP growth rate for the period 1901–2000 was 3.4% annually. As opposed to many neighbouring Southeast Asian countries, the process towards independence was relatively peaceful and thus did not have significant negative impact on the economy and standard of living. Growth peaked during the 1920s, followed by the 1950s and the 1980s. By contrast, the late 1910s/early 1920s, the 1930s, the 1970s and early 1990s were marked by financial crises.

==== Economic liberalisation ====
ABC News report, featuring Paul Keating, on the first day of trading with a floating Australian dollar

Annual percentage growth in real (chain volume) GDP per capita since 1961

Real GDP per capita development in Australia and New Zealand

From the early 1980s onwards, the Australian economy has undergone intermittent economic liberalisation. In 1983, under prime minister Bob Hawke, but mainly driven by treasurer Paul Keating, the Australian dollar was floated and financial deregulation was undertaken.

==== Early 1990s recession ====
The early 1990s recession came swiftly after the Black Monday of October 1987, as a result of a stock collapse of unprecedented size which caused the Dow Jones Industrial Average to fall by 22.6%. This collapse, larger than the stock market crash of 1929, was handled effectively by the global economy and the stock market began to quickly recover. But in North America, the lumbering savings and loans industry was facing decline, which eventually led to a savings and loan crisis which compromised the well-being of millions of US people. The following recession thus impacted the many countries closely linked to the US, including Australia. Paul Keating, who was treasurer at the time, famously referred to it as "the recession that Australia had to have." During the recession, GDP fell by 1.7%, employment by 3.4% and the unemployment rate rose to 10.8%. However, the recession did assist in reducing long-term inflation rate expectations and Australia has maintained a low inflation environment since the 1990s to the present day.

=== Mining ===
Mining has contributed to Australia's high level of economic growth, from the gold rush in the 1840s to the present day. The opportunities for large profits in pastoralism and mining attracted considerable amounts of British capital, while expansion was supported by enormous government outlays for transport, communication, and urban infrastructures, which also depended heavily on British finance. As the economy expanded, large-scale immigration satisfied the growing demand for workers, especially after the end of convict transportation to the eastern mainland in 1840. Australia's mining operations secured continued economic growth and Western Australia itself benefited strongly from mining iron ore and gold from the 1960s and 1970s which fuelled the rise of suburbanisation and consumerism in Perth, the capital and most populous city of Western Australia, as well as other regional centres.

=== 2008 financial crisis ===
Australia is one of the three Organisation for Economic Co-operation and Development (OECD) countries that did not experience two consecutive negative quarters of growth and one of the two that avoided negative year-end GDP growth during the global recession. It was not affected by the crisis from 2008 to 2009 due to a number of factors such as government stimulus spending of $11.8 billion, its proximity to the booming Chinese economy and the related mining boom kept growth ticking over throughout the worst of the global conditions. In fact, sources such as the IMF and the Reserve Bank of Australia had predicted Australia was well positioned to weather the crisis with minimal disruption, sustaining more than 2% GDP growth in 2009 (as many Western nations went into recession). In the same year, the World Economic Forum ranked Australia's banking system the fourth best in the world, while the Australian dollar's 30% drop was seen as a boon for trade, shielding the country from the crisis and helping to slow growth and consumption. Australia's recession affected New Zealand's economy as Australia was New Zealand's biggest export market. It is said that the term Great Recession as a description of the post-2008 slump is not recognized by Australians particularly those under 30 due to its mild, intangible impact on the country's economy.

Some analysts had predicted the continuing decline of trade in 2009 could put the economy into recession for the first time in 17 years. However, these initial fears were proved largely unfounded as the Australian economy avoided recession and the unemployment rate peaked at a much lower rate than had been predicted. To help address the anticipated slowdown, the Australian government also announced a stimulus package worth $27 billion to spur economic growth while the Reserve Bank of Australia introduced a series of interest rate cuts.

While Australia's overall national economy grew, some non-mining states and Australia's non-mining economy experienced a recession.

=== 2010s ===
The World Bank expected Australia's GDP growth rate to be 3.2% in 2011 and 3.8% in 2012. The economy expanded by 0.4% in the fourth quarter of 2011, and expanded by 1.3% in the first quarter of 2012. The growth rate was reported to be 4.3% year-on-year.

The International Monetary Fund in April 2012 predicted that Australia would be the best-performing major advanced economy in the world over the next two years; the Australian Government Department of the Treasury anticipated "forecast growth of 3.0% in 2012 and 3.5% in 2013", the National Australia Bank in April 2012 cut its growth forecast for Australia to 2.9% from 3.2%., and JP Morgan in May 2012 cut its growth forecast to 2.7% in calendar 2012 from a previous forecast of 3.0%, also its forecast for growth in 2013 to 3.0% from 3.3%. Deutsche Bank in August 2012, and Société Générale in October 2012, warned that there is risk of recession in Australia in 2013.

=== COVID-19 pandemic and recession ===
In September 2020, it was confirmed that due to the effects of lockdowns and other government responses to the COVID-19 pandemic, the Australian economy had gone into recession for the first time in nearly thirty years, as the country's GDP fell 7 per cent in the June 2020 quarter, following a 0.3 per cent drop in the March quarter. It officially ended at the beginning of December 2020.

=== 2020s recovery ===
Following the 2020 recession, triggered by the COVID-19 pandemic, Australia has faced ongoing economic challenges, including rising inflation, worsening housing affordability, and cost-of-living pressures. Inflation peaked at 6.1% in May 2022, falling to 3.6% by March 2024 and 2.4% by December 2024, within the Reserve Bank of Australia's 2–3% target. However, core inflation remained at 3.5% in September 2024, with services inflation at 4.6%, indicating persistent domestic pressures. Food prices rose 11.7% and gas 33.9% since 2022, outpacing wage growth of 3.5% annually, while energy rebates capped electricity rises at 2.0% instead of 14.9%.

The rising cost of living and inflationary pressure has, in large part, been driven by worsening housing affordability in Australia, with housing costs the largest contributor to CPI inflation. Housing affordability has experienced a rapid decline since the start of the decade, driven by increasing demand and insufficient supply. The shortfall in housing has been driven by several factors, including a significant increase in land prices of more than 500% increase since 2000.

Since 2019, Australian households experienced the sharpest decline in real disposable income of any country in the OECD. According to a comparative analysis of OECD data, real per capita household disposable income in Australia fell by 8.0% over the two years leading up to March 2024. This stands in marked contrast to the OECD average, which recorded a 2.6% increase over the same period. Real GDP per capita fell for 7 consecutive quarters during 2023 and 2024, before a 0.1% increase in the December 2024 quarter. This was however followed by another decline in the March 2025 quarter.

This performance positions Australia as an outlier among developed economies and has prompted growing concern over the government's management of the cost-of-living crisis. While most OECD nations saw household incomes either stabilise or rise, supported by targeted fiscal interventions and effective inflation control, Australian households endured a sustained erosion of purchasing power.

The fall in real incomes coincided with heightened inflationary pressures, elevated interest rates, and a housing market that remains inaccessible for many. The result has been a tangible reduction in living standards, particularly for middle- and low-income earners, with stagnant wages failing to keep pace with rising costs. Critics argue that the government's fiscal strategy has lacked the responsiveness seen in peer nations, leading to Australia's unique position as the OECD's worst performer on this key economic indicator.

== Data ==
The following table shows the main economic indicators in 1980–2025 (with IMF staff estimates in 2026–2029). Inflation under 5% is in green.

Year	GDP (PPP) US$ billions	GDP per capita (PPP) US$	GDP (nominal) US$ billions	GDP per capita (nominal) US$	GDP growth rate (real)	Inflation rate (% change)	Unemployment (% total labor force)	Government debt (% of GDP)
1980	152.120	10,277.16	162.924	11,007.11	▲2.9%	▲10.1%	6.1%	n/a
1981	▲173.384	▲11,528.86	▲188.410	▲12,527.97	▲4.1%	▲9.5%	▼5.8%	n/a
1982	▲184.214	▲12,048.89	▼187.049	▼12,234.34	▲0.1%	▲11.4%	▲7.2%	n/a
1983	▲190.521	▲12,304.79	▼179.478	▲12,304.79	▼-0.5%	▲10.0%	▲10.0%	n/a
1984	▲209.924	▲13,390.35	▲197.136	▲12,574.63	▲6.3%	▲4.0%	▼9.0%	n/a
1985	▲228.379	▲14,362.95	▼174.385	▼10,967.20	▲5.5%	▲6.7%	▼8.3%	n/a
1986	▲238.681	▲14,789.27	▲181.477	▲11,244.81	▲2.5%	▲9.1%	▼8.1%	n/a
1987	▲256.562	▲15,649.17	▲213.100	▲12,998.14	▲4.9%	▲8.5%	8.1%	n/a
1988	▲276.907	▲16,594.12	▲271.088	▲16,245.41	▲4.3%	▲7.3%	▼7.2%	n/a
1989	▲301.099	▲17,777.88	▲308.402	▲18,209.05	▲4.6%	▲7.6%	▼6.1%	17.0%
1990	▲317.033	▲18,464.63	▲324.128	▲18,877.81	▲1.5%	▲7.2%	▲6.9%	▼16.4%
1991	▲324.539	▲18,674.21	▲324.436	▼18,668.31	▼-1.0%	▲3.3%	▲9.6%	▲21.6%
1992	▲340.536	▲19,395.88	▼318.005	▼18,112.56	▲2.6%	▲1.0%	▲10.7%	▲27.6%
1993	▲362.276	▲20,445.50	▼309.303	▼17,455.94	▲3.9%	▲1.8%	▲10.9%	▲30.7%
1994	▲388.049	▲21,686.66	▲353.372	▲19,748.72	▲4.9%	▲1.9%	▼9.7%	▲31.7%
1995	▲407.875	▲22,510.16	▲379.227	▲20,929.06	▲3.0%	▲4.6%	▼8.5%	▼31.1%
1996	▲431.844	▲23,559.29	▲424.663	▲23,167.55	▲4.0%	▲2.7%	8.5%	▼29.4%
1997	▼426.401	▲24,851.08	▲426.401	▼23,036.27	▲4.7%	▲0.2%	▼8.4%	▼25.9%
1998	▲486.893	▲26,029.25	▼381.498	▼20,394.83	▲4.7%	▲0.9%	▼7.7%	▼23.7%
1999	▲515.691	▲27,257.54	▲411.968	▲21,775.12	▲4.4%	▲1.4%	▼6.9%	▼22.5%
2000	▲543.715	▲28,405.74	▼400.278	▼20,912.04	▲3.1%	▲4.5%	▼6.3%	▼19.5%
2001	▲570.416	▲29,423.44	▼378.114	▼19,504.00	▲2.6%	▲4.4%	▲6.8%	▼17.1%
2002	▲603.374	▲30,775.86	▲425.516	▲21,703.96	▲4.2%	▲3.1%	▼6.4%	▼15.0%
2003	▲633.840	▲31,968.30	▲541.155	▲27,293.62	▲3.0%	▲2.7%	▼5.9%	▼13.2%
2004	▲677.656	▲33,805.05	▲658.742	▲32,861.50	▲4.1%	▲2.3%	▼5.4%	▼11.9%
2005	▲720.078	▲35,451.67	▲736.505	▲36,260.40	▲3.0%	▲2.7%	▼5.0%	▼10.9%
2006	▲761.733	▲36,927.94	▲783.447	▲37,980.62	▲2.6%	▲3.6%	▼4.8%	▼9.9%
2007	▲816.319	▲38,842.53	▲950.093	▲45,207.84	▲4.3%	▲2.4%	▼4.4%	▼9.7%
2008	▲853.630	▲39,748.80	▲1,056.559	▲49,198.06	▲2.6%	▲4.4%	▼4.3%	▲11.7%
2009	▲875.769	▲40,052.30	▼1,000.828	▼45,771.77	▲2.0%	▲1.8%	▲5.6%	▲16.6%
2010	▲907.855	▲40,945.17	▲1,254.623	▲56,584.71	▲2.4%	▲2.9%	▼5.2%	▲20.4%
2011	▲952.396	▲42,286.99	▲1,515.507	▲67,289.47	▲2.8%	▲3.4%	▼5.1%	▲24.0%
2012	▲1,006.887	▲43,915.14	▲1,570.139	▲68,481.22	▲3.8%	▲1.7%	▲5.2%	▲27.5%
2013	▲1,046.747	▲44,929.07	▼1,519.900	▼65,237.98	▲2.2%	▲2.5%	▲5.7%	▲30.5%
2014	▲1,092.400	▲46,209.16	▼1,456.939	▼61,629.37	▲2.6%	▲2.5%	▲6.1%	▲34.0%
2015	▲1,128.341	▲47,044.42	▼1,233.921	▼51,446.42	▲2.3%	▲1.5%	6.1%	▲37.8%
2016	▲1,169.751	▲47,969.96	▲1,262.655	▲51,779.84	▲2.7%	▲1.3%	▼5.7%	▲40.6%
2017	▲1,219.041	▲49,236.24	▲1,381.110	▲55,782.11	▲2.4%	▲2.0%	▼5.6%	▲41.2%
2018	▲1,288.250	▲51,230.51	▲1,417.162	▲56,357.04	▲2.8%	▲1.9%	▼5.3%	▲41.8%
2019	▲1,366.059	▲53,527.98	▼1,386.277	▼54,320.19	▲2.0%	▲1.6%	▼5.2%	▲46.7%
2020	▲1,379.014	▲53,803.21	▼1,362.613	▼53,803.21	▼-2.0%	▲0.9%	▲6.5%	▲57.1%
2021	▲1,554.734	▲60,327.98	▲1,655.843	▲64,251.28	▲5.4%	▲2.8%	▼5.1%	▲55.5%
2022	▲1,734.565	▲65,920.12	▲1,725.461	▲65,574.14	▲4.1%	▲6.6%	▼3.7%	▼50.2%
2023	▲1,833.927	▲68,045.91	▲1,742.461	▼64,652.15	▲2.0%	▲5.6%	▲3.7%	▼49.0%
2024	▲1,897.774	▲69,970.69	▲1,796.805	▲66,247.96	▲1.0%	▲3.2%	▲4.0%	▲49.8%
2025	▲1,980.022	▲72,137.53	▼1,771.681	▼64,547.10	▲1.6%	▲2.6%	▲4.3%	▲50.9%
2026	▲2,065.340	▲74,353.64	▲1,841.002	▲66,277.32	▲2.1%	▲3.5%	▲4.5%	▼50.5%
2027	▲2,151.649	▲76,542.32	▲1,914.821	▲68,117.43	▲2.3%	▲2.5%	▲4.8%	▼49.8%
2028	▲2,247.631	▲79,008.63	▲1,995.441	▲70,143.68	▲2.3%	▲2.6%	▲4.5%	▼49.3%
2029	▲2,341.261	▲81,324.037	▲2,083.608	▲72,374.44	▲2.3%	▲2.5%	▲4.5%	▼49.0%

The real GDP per capita growth for 2025 was 0.9%.

== Overview ==
Exports of Australia by product category (2019) Chemical products Transportation Machines Mineral products Plastics and rubbers Metals Foodstuffs Precious metals Textiles Instruments Animal products Vegetable products Paper goods Footwear and headwear Miscellaneous Stone and glass Wood products Animal and vegetable bi-products Animal hides Arts and antiques Weapons

Australia's annual inflation rate (percentage change in CPI) since 1949

Australia's per-capita GDP is higher than that of the UK, Canada, Germany and France in terms of purchasing power parity. Per Capita GDP (PPP) Australia is ranked 18th in the world (CIA World Factbook 2016). The country was ranked fifth in the United Nations 2022 Human Development Index and sixth in The Economist worldwide quality-of-life index 2005. In 2014, using constant exchange rates, Australia's wealth had grown by 4.4% annually on average after the 2008 financial crisis, compared with a 9.2% rate over 2000–2007. Australia's sovereign credit rating is "AAA" for all three major rating agencies, higher than the United States of America.

The emphasis on exporting commodities rather than manufacturing underpinned a significant increase in Australia's terms of trade during the rise in commodity prices since 2000. However, due to a colonial heritage a lot of companies operating in Australia are foreign-owned and as a result, Australia has had persistent current account deficits for over 60 years despite periods of positive net merchandise exports; given the net income outlay between Australia and the rest of the world is always negative. The current account deficit totalled AUD$44.5 billion in 2016 or 2.6% of GDP.

Inflation has typically been between 2 and 3% and the pre-GFC cash rate typically ranged between 5 and 7%, however, partly in response to the end of the mining boom the cash rate has recently been steadily falling, dropping from 4.75% in October 2011 to 1.5% in Aug 2016, then to 1.25% in June 2019 and 1.0% in July 2019. The service sector of the economy, including tourism, education and financial services, constitutes 69% of GDP. Australian National University in Canberra also provides a probabilistic interest-rate-setting project for the Australian economy, which is compiled by shadow board members from the ANU academic staff.

Rich in natural resources, Australia is a major exporter of agricultural products, particularly wheat and wool, minerals such as iron ore and gold, and energy in the forms of liquified natural gas and coal. Although agriculture and natural resources constitute only 3% and 5% of GDP, respectively, they contribute substantially to Australia's export composition. Australia's largest export markets are Japan, China, South Korea, India and the United States.

At the turn of the current century, Australia experienced a significant mining boom. The mining sector's contribution to overall GDP grew from around 4.5% in 1993–94, to almost 8% in 2006–07. The services sector also grew considerably, with property and business services in particular growing from 10% to 14.5% of GDP over the same period, making it the largest single component of GDP (in sectoral terms). This growth has largely been at the expense of the manufacturing sector, which in 2006–07 accounted for around 12% of GDP. A decade earlier, it was the largest sector in the economy, accounting for just over 15% of GDP.

In 2018 Australia became the country with the largest median wealth per adult, but slipped back to second highest after Switzerland in 2019. Australia's total wealth was estimated to be AUD$10.9 trillion as of September 2019.

=== Regional differences ===
Between 2010 and 2013, much of the economic growth in Australia was attributed to areas of the country where mining- and resource-based industries and services are mostly located. Western Australia and the Northern Territory are the only states that have economic growth. During 2012 and 2013 Australian Capital Territory, Queensland, Tasmania, South Australia, New South Wales and Victoria experienced recessions at various times. The Australian economy is characterised as a "two-speed economy". From June 2012 to March 2013 Victoria experienced a recession. In 2012 the Government of Victoria cut 10% of all jobs in the public service. The period since has seen these trends reversed with Western Australia and Northern Territory, who are heavily dependent on mining, experience significant downturns in GDP while the eastern states returned to growth, led by strong upturns in NSW and Victoria.

=== Taxation ===
Quarterly taxation revenue ($millions) since 1959

Taxation in Australia is levied at the federal, state, and local government levels. The federal government raises revenue from personal income taxes and business taxes. Other taxes include the goods and services tax (General Service Tax), excise and customs duties. The federal government is the main source of income for state governments. As a result of state dependence on federal taxation revenue to meet decentralised expenditure responsibilities, Australia is said to have a vertical fiscal imbalance.

Besides receipts of funds from the federal government, states and territories have their own taxes, in many cases as slightly different rates. State taxes commonly include payroll tax levied on businesses, a poker-machine tax on businesses that offer gambling services, land tax on people and businesses that own land and most significantly, stamp duty on sales of land (in every state) and other items (chattels in some states, unlisted shares in others, and even sales of contracts in some states).

The states effectively lost the ability to raise income tax during the Second World War. In 1942, Canberra invoked its Constitutional taxation power (s. 51 (ii)) and enacted the Income Tax Act and three other statutes to levy a uniform income tax across the country. These acts sought to raise the funds necessary to meet burgeoning wartime expenses and reduce the unequal tax burden between the states by replacing state income taxes with a centralised tax system. The legislation could not expressly prohibit state income taxes (s. 51(ii) does not curtail the power of states to levy taxes) but the federal government's proposal made localised income tax extremely difficult politically. The federal government offered instead compensatory grants authorised by s. 96 of the Constitution for the loss of state income (State Grants (Income Tax Reimbursement) Act 1942).

The states rejected Canberra's regime and challenged the legislation's validity in the First Uniform Tax Case (South Australia v Commonwealth) of 1942. The High Court of Australia held that each of the statutes establishing Commonwealth income tax was a valid use of the s. 51(ii) power, in which Latham CJ noted that the system did not undermine essential state functions and imposed only economic and political pressure upon them.

The Second Uniform Tax Case (Victoria v Commonwealth (1957)) reaffirmed the court's earlier decision and confirmed the power of the federal government's power to make s. 96 grants conditionally (in this case, a grant made on the condition that the recipient state does not levy income tax).

Since the Second Uniform Tax Case, a number of other political and legal decisions have centralised fiscal power with the Commonwealth. In Ha vs. New South Wales (1997), the High Court found that the Business Franchise Licences (Tobacco) Act 1987 (NSW) was invalid because it levied a customs duty, a power exercisable only by the Commonwealth (s.90). This decision effectively invalidated state taxes on cigarettes, alcohol and petrol. Similarly, the imposition of a Commonwealth goods and services tax (GST) in 2000 transferred another revenue base to the Commonwealth.

Consequently, Australia has one of the most pronounced vertical fiscal imbalances in the world: the states and territories collect just 18% of all governmental revenues but are responsible for almost 50% of the spending areas. Furthermore, the centralisation of revenue collection has allowed Canberra to force state policy in areas well beyond the scope of its constitutional powers, by using the grants power (s.96) to mandate the terms on which the states spend money in areas over which it has no power (such as spending on education, health and policing).

Local governments (called councils in Australia) have their own taxes (called rates) to enable them to provide services such as local road repairs, local planning and building management, garbage collection, street cleaning, park maintenance services, libraries, and museums. Councils also rely on state and federal funding to provide infrastructure and services such as roads, bridges, sporting facilities and buildings, aged care, maternal and child health, and childcare.

In 2000, a goods and services tax (GST) was introduced, similar to the European-style VAT.

== Government finances and policies ==
An Australian federal budget is a document that sets out the estimated revenues and expenditures of the Australian Treasury in the following financial year, proposed conduct of Australian government operations in that period, and its fiscal policy for the forward years. Budgets are called by the year in which they are presented to Parliament and relate to a financial year that commences on the following 1 July and ends on 30 June of the following year, so that the 2026 budget brought down in May 2026 relates to the 2026/27 financial year (1 July 2026 – 30 June 2027, FY2027).

Revenue estimates detailed in the budget are raised through the Australian taxation system, with government spending (including transfers to the states) representing a sizeable proportion of the overall economy. Besides presenting the government's expected revenues and expenditures, the federal budget is also a political statement of the government's intentions and priorities, and has profound macroeconomic implications.

Australia follows, to a great extent, the conventions of the Westminster system. For example, the prime minister must have the support of a majority in the House of Representatives, and must in any case be able to ensure the existence of no absolute majority against the government. In relation to the budget, that requires that if the House fails to pass the government's budget, even by one dollar, then the government must either resign so that a different government can be appointed or seek a parliamentary dissolution so that new general elections may be held in order to re-confirm or deny the government's mandate.

=== Welfare ===
Social security in Australia refers to a system of social welfare payments provided by the Australian Government and the states and territories of Australia to eligible Australian citizens, permanent residents, and limited international visitors. These payments are almost always administered by Centrelink, a program of Services Australia. In Australia, most payments are means tested.

The system includes payments to retirees, job seekers, parents (especially new and single parents), people with disabilities and their caregivers, guardians of orphans, students and apprentices, and people who have no way of supporting themselves.

== Employment ==
The seasonally adjusted unemployment rate since 1978

The number of job vacancies (thousands) since 1979

According to the Australian Bureau of Statistics (ABS) seasonally adjusted estimates, the unemployment rate remained steady at 4.6% in August 2026 while the labour force participation rate increased 0.2 points to 67.1%. The participation rate for 15- to 24-year-olds decreased by 0.7 points to 71.2% while the unemployment rate for this group decreased by 0.1 points to 10.1%. According to the ABS, in September 2026, the underemployment rate decreased by 0.1 points to 6.2%, while the underutilisation rate (the unemployed plus the under-employed) increased by 0.1 points to 10.2% seasonally adjusted.

As of June 2025, the number of JobSeeker Payment recipients stands at 883,700 or 5.8% of the labour force.

The accuracy of official unemployment figures has been brought into question in the Australian media due to discrepancies between the methods of different research bodies (Roy Morgan versus the ABS), differing definitions of the term 'unemployed' and the ABS' practice of counting under-employed people as "employed".

As of July 2025, the Australia labour force were employed in the following industries (seasonally adjusted) :

Rank	Industry	No. of employees ('000s)	% of total
1	Health care and social assistance	2314.7	15.9%
2	Construction	1378.6	9.5%
3	Retail trade	1329.6	9.1%
4	Professional, scientific and technical services	1278.1	8.8%
5	Education and training	1260.6	8.7%
6	Public administration and safety	987.5	6.8%
7	Accommodation and food services	960.9	6.6%
8	Manufacturing	884.8	6.1%
9	Transport, postal and warehousing	736.7	5.1%
10	Financial and insurance services	561.2	3.9%
11	Administrative and support services	427.2	2.9%
12	Wholesale trade	346.0	2.4%
13	Mining	331.6	2.3%
14	Agriculture, forestry and fishing	291.8	2.0%
15	Arts and recreation services	280.1	1.9%
16	Rental, hiring and real estate services	247.6	1.7%
17	Information media and telecommunications	192.2	1.3%
18	Electricity, gas, water and waste services	187.2	1.3%
	Total labour force	14538.8	100.0%

=== Employment for newly qualified professionals ===
According to the Australian Graduate Survey done by Graduate Careers Australia, full-time employment for newly qualified professionals from various occupations (around four months after the completion of their qualifications) experienced some declines between 2012 and 2015. Some examples are:

Field of Education	2012	2013	2014	2015	Change 2012–2015
Dentistry	83.6%	83.3%	79.6%	86.7%	+3.1%
Computer Science	74.7%	70.3%	67.2%	67%	-7.7%
Architecture	63.9%	60.0%	57.8%	70.2%	+6.3%
Psychology	63.1%	56.1%	52.1%	55.2%	-7.9%
Business studies	74.5%	71.8%	69.7%	70.8%	-3.7%
Electronic/Computer engineering	79.5%	80.9%	74.9%	78.1%	-1.4%
Mechanical engineering	88.4%	82.4%	71.0%	72.2%	-16.2%
Surveying	93.0%	86.5%	83.9%	90.7%	-2.3%
Health other	73.3%	69.7%	70.4%	69.2%	-4.1%
Nursing (initial)	92.2%	83.1%	80.5%	79%	-13.2%
Nursing (post-initial)	86.1%	71.4%	75.8%	74.9%	-11.2%
Medicine	98.1%	96.9%	97.5%	96.3%	-1.8%
Education (initial)	74.9%	70.8%	70%	71.8%	-3.1%
Education (post-initial)	58.8%	71.4%	69.2%	72.7%	+13.9%

The Graduate Careers Survey 2014 explained, "However, GCA's Beyond Graduation Survey (BGS) indicates that the middle- and longer-term outlook is very positive, with the employment figures for 2010 graduates growing by 14 percentage points three years later." The Beyond Graduation Survey 2013 included 12,384 responses and the Graduate Careers Survey 2014 survey included 113,263 responses ("59.3 per cent of the almost 191,000 Australian resident graduates who were surveyed responded to the AGS.")

The professional associations of some of these occupations expressed their criticism of the immigration policy in 2014.

=== States and territories ranked by unemployment rates ===
Rank	States	Unemployment rate (March 2026)
1	Victoria	4.8%
2	Tasmania	4.6%
3	Northern Territory	4.4%
4	New South Wales	4.3%
5	Australian Capital Territory	4.2%
6	Western Australia	4.2%
7	South Australia	4.0%
8	Queensland	3.7%

Note: All data in the table above is seasonally adjusted.

== Sectors ==
Gross operating profits across all industries since 1994 ($millions/quarter)

=== Industry ===
==== Mining ====
Australian energy resources and major export ports map

In 2019, the country was the second largest world producer of gold; 8th largest world producer of silver; 6th largest world producer of copper; the world's largest producer of iron ore; the world's largest producer of bauxite; the second largest world producer of manganese; second largest world producer of lead; third largest world producer of zinc; third largest world producer of cobalt; third largest producer of uranium (25% of the world's known supply), 6th largest producer of nickel; 8th largest world producer of tin; 14th largest world producer of phosphate; 15th largest world producer of sulfur; in addition to being the 5th largest world producer of salt. The country is also a major producer of precious stones. Australia is the world's largest producer of opal and is one of the largest producers of diamond, ruby, sapphire and jade. In non-renewable energies, in 2020, the country was the 30th largest producer of oil in the world, extracting 351.1 thousand barrels / day. In 2019, the country consumed 1 million barrels / day (20th largest consumer in the world). The country was the 20th largest oil importer in the world in 2018 (461.9 thousand barrels / day). In 2015, Australia was the 12th largest world producer of natural gas, 67.2 billion m3 per year. In 2019, the country was the 22nd largest gas consumer (41.9 billion m3 per year) and was the 10th largest gas exporter in the world in 2015: 34.0 billion m3 per year. In the production of coal, the country was the 4th largest in the world in 2018: 481.3 million tons. Australia is the second largest coal exporter in the world (387 million tons in 2018).

In 2014–15 mineral extraction in Australia was valued at 212 billion Australian dollars. Of this, coal represented 45,869 million, oil and natural gas 40,369 million, iron ore 69,486 million, gold ore 13,685 million, and other metals 7,903 million.

Coal is mined primarily in Queensland, New South Wales and Victoria. Fifty-four per cent of the coal mined in Australia is exported, mostly to East Asia. In 2000–01, 258.5 million tonnes of coal was mined, and 193.6 million tonnes exported. Coal provides about 85% of Australia's electricity production. In fiscal year 2008–09, 487 million tonnes of coal was mined, and 261 million tonnes exported. Australia is the world's leading coal exporter.

BHP and Rio Tinto and are among the largest mining companies in the world.

Rio Tinto's Argyle mine in Western Australia was the second-largest diamond mine in the world. The Argyle mine opened in 1983 and has produced more than 95 per cent of Australia's diamonds, including some of the world's most valuable pink and red diamonds. Due to the depletion of ore, Argyle closed in 2020—the closure was expected to reduce Australia's yearly diamond output from 14.2 million carats to 134.7 thousand carats.

==== Petroleum ====
Australia is a minor petroleum producer and importer, with a number of petroleum companies involved in upstream and downstream operations. Western Australia is the largest contributor to Australia's production of most petroleum products.

==== Manufacturing ====
The manufacturing industry in Australia has declined from 30% of GDP in the 1960s to 12% of GDP in 2007.

In 2008, four companies mass-produced cars in Australia. Mitsubishi ceased production in March 2008, followed by Ford in 2016, and Holden and Toyota in 2017.

Until trade liberalisation in the mid-1980s, Australia had a large textile industry. This decline continued through the first decade of the 21st century. Since the 1980s, tariffs have steadily been reduced; in early 2010, the tariffs were reduced from 17.5 per cent to 10 per cent on clothing, and 7.5–10% to 5% for footwear and other textiles. As of 2010, most textile manufacturing, even by Australian companies, is performed in Asia.

Total employment in Australian textile, clothing and footwear manufacturing (thousands of people) since 1984

==== Agriculture, aquaculture and forestry ====
In 2019, the value added from agriculture, fishing and forestry combined made up approximately 2.1% of Australia's GDP. 60% of farm products are exported. Irrigation is an important and widespread practice for a country where many parts receive low rainfall. Agriculture, forestry and fishing was the second-strongest industry from 2013 to 2015, with the number of employees growing from 295,495 in February 2013 to 325,321 in February 2015.

==== Defence ====
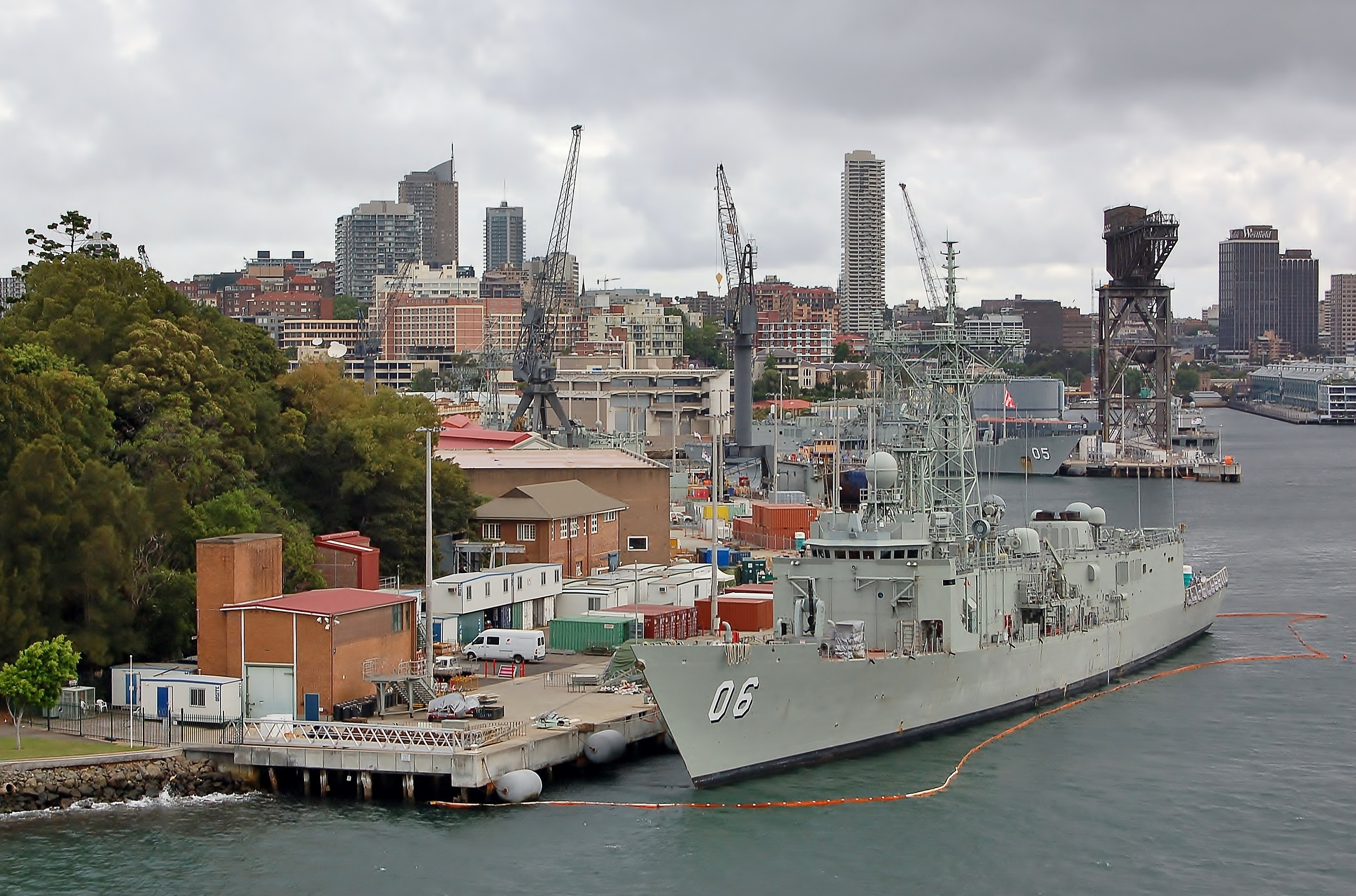
The Australian-built frigate HMAS Newcastle and other warships at Fleet Base East in Sydney, a major centre for the Australian defence industry

The defence industry of Australia provides military equipment, supplies and services for the Australian Defence Force (ADF) and export customers. Definitions of what the defence industry comprises and estimates of its size differ, but it was believed to have employed between 12,000 and 29,000 people as of the mid-2010s. The industry has grown over recent years, and Australian Defence Magazine reported that the 40 largest companies had a total revenue of $A 9.2 billion in 2015.

=== Services ===
IT-related jobs (such as computer systems design and engineering) are defined as Professional, Scientific and Technical Services by the Department of Education, Employment and Workplace Relations of Australia. IT job creation occurs mostly in the state capital cities of Australia.

==== Housing and real estate ====
The Australian property market comprises the trade of land and its permanent fixtures located within Australia. It is dominated by residential property and forms a central part of the national economy, with housing serving as the main store of household wealth and the construction and sale of dwellings accounting for a substantial share of economic activity and employment. The market is characterised by a concentration of population and value in the major capital cities, a housing stock weighted towards detached houses, and high levels of owner-occupation alongside a large private rental sector. Underlying demand for housing is shaped chiefly by population growth, which is rapid by international standards and driven largely by immigration, and by the average number of people living in each household. Supply responds more slowly, so prices and rents tend to adjust in the meantime.

Australian housing has drawn sustained attention for the long-run rise in prices relative to incomes, which has made affordability a recurring economic and political issue, and for one of the highest levels of household debt among advanced economies, most of it owed against housing. Real house prices changed little for much of the twentieth century before entering a sustained upward trend from the 1950s, rising particularly strongly from the mid-1990s after the financial deregulation of the 1980s opened mortgage lending to greater competition and treated housing increasingly as an investment asset. There has been a disagreement among researchers about the main causes of higher prices, variously emphasising interest rates, population growth and immigration, constraints on the supply of new housing, and tax settings favouring property investment, and about whether the market constitutes a housing bubble.

==== Banking and finance ====
Australia's "big four banks" (National Australia Bank, Commonwealth Bank, Australia and New Zealand Banking Group and Westpac) are among the 'World's 50 Safest Banks' as of April 2012.

Between 1991 and 2013, 36,720 mergers and acquisitions with a total known value of US$2,040 billion with the involvement of Australian firms have been announced. In the year 2013, 1,515 transactions valued at US$78 billion had been announced which was a decrease in terms of numbers (−18%) and value (−11%) compared to 2012. The largest takeover or merger transaction involving Australian companies was the 2007 takeover of the Coles Group by Wesfarmers, totalling A$22 billion.

==== Tourism ====
Monthly short-term arrivals in Australia since 1991. The large drop in arrivals in 2020 is due to the COVID-19 pandemic.

In the financial year 2017/18, tourism represented 3.1% of Australia's GDP contributing A$57.2 billion to the national economy. Domestic tourism is a significant part of the tourism industry, representing 73% of the total direct tourism GDP.

In calendar year 2018, there were 9.3 million visitor arrivals. Tourism employed 646,000 people in Australia in 2017–18, 5.2% of the workforce. About 43.7% of persons employed in tourism were part-time. Tourism also contributed 8.0% of Australia's total export earnings in 2010–11.

==== Creativity and culture ====
Growing importance is being given to the economic contribution of the creative industries to the national economy. The United Nations Conference on Trade and Development (UNCTAD) recompiles statistics about the export and import of goods and services related to the creative industries. The World Intellectual Property Organization (WIPO) has assisted in the preparation of national studies measuring the size of over 50 copyright industries around the world. According to the WIPO compiled data, the national contribution of Creative industries varies from 2% to 11% depending on the country.

The Australian Copyright Council (ACC) has been consistently compiling reports using the WIPO-guided framework on the impact of the copyright-based industries to Australia's economy in 2011, 2012, and 2014. In the most up-to-date WIPO-supported study published in 2017, the copyright industries contributed $122.8 billion to the Australian economy in 2016 amounting to 7.4% of Australia's total economic output. The 2016 figure represented an increase of $8.5 billion compared to 2011, with a growth in value added growing at 1.4% per annum (since 2011). Further, it found that these industries generated more economic output than the manufacturing, health care and mining sectors in 2016, and moved from being the 7th largest industry in 2011 to the 3rd in 2016.

==== Media and telecommunications ====
In 2018, Australia was ranked 19th out of 180 countries in accordance to press freedom. The media industry is highly consolidated, with News Corp Australia and Nine Entertainment publishing the majority of popular newspapers, owning multiple television and radio stations, and providing the two major Australian streaming services, Binge and Stan. Other major media companies include Paramount Australia & New Zealand, Seven West Media and the national broadcasters ABC and SBS.

==== Education ====
School attendance is compulsory in Australia, from the age of 5 up until approximately 16 (although it varies between each state and territory). Australia also has an adult literacy rate that was estimated to be 99% in 2003.

In the Programme for International Student Assessment, Australia regularly scores among the top five of thirty major developed countries (member countries of the Organisation for Economic Co-operation and Development). In 2018 there were 525,054 international students in Australia, comprising a market of 32,2 billion A$.

==== Healthcare ====
Adults employed in the health care and social assistance industry as a percentage of the adult population in Australia in the 2011 census, divided geographically by statistical local area

Medical and other health care services

Hospitals

Total employment (thousands of people) since 1984

Health care in Australia operates under a shared public-private model underpinned by the Medicare system, the national single-payer funding model. State and territory governments operate public health facilities where eligible patients receive care free of charge. Primary health services, such as GP clinics, are privately owned in most situations, but attract Medicare rebates. Australian citizens, permanent residents, and some visitors and visa holders are eligible for health services under the Medicare system. Individuals are encouraged through tax surcharges to purchase health insurance to cover services offered in the private sector, and further fund health care.

In 1999, the Howard government introduced the private health insurance rebate scheme, under which the government contributed up to 30% of the private health insurance premium of people covered by Medicare. Including these rebates, Medicare is the major component of the total Commonwealth health budget, taking up about 43% of the total. The program was estimated to cost $18.3 billion in 2007–08. In 2009 before means testing was introduced, the private health insurance rebate was estimated to cost $4 billion, around 20% of the total budget. The overall figure was projected to rise by almost 4% annually in real terms in 2007. In 2013–14 Medicare expenditure was $19 billion and expected to reach $23.6 billion in 2016/7. In 2017–18, total health spending was $185.4 billion, equating to $7,485 per person, an increase of 1.2%, which was lower than the decade average of 3.9%. The majority of health spending went on hospitals (40%) and primary health care (34%). Health spending accounted for 10% of overall economic activity.

State and territory governments (through agencies such as Queensland Health) regulate and administer the major elements of healthcare such as doctors, public hospitals and ambulance services. The federal Minister for Health sets national health policy and may attach conditions to funding provided to state and territory governments. The funding model for healthcare in Australia has seen political polarisation, with governments being crucial in shaping national healthcare policy.

In 2013, the National Disability Insurance Scheme (NDIS) was commenced. This provides a national platform to individuals with disability to gain access to funding. The NDIS aims to provide resources to support individuals with disabilities in terms of medical management as well as social support to assist them in pursuing their dreams, careers, and hobbies. The NDIS also has supports for family members to aid them in taking care of their loved ones and avoid issues like carer burnout. Unfortunately, the National Disability Insurance Scheme is not without its limitations but overall the system is standardised across Australia and has helped many people with disabilities improve their quality of life.

=== Science and technology ===
In 2019, Australia spent $35.6 billion on research and development, allocating about 1.79% of GDP. A 2022 study by the industry lobby group, The Tech Council of Australia, stated that the Australian technology sector combined contributes $167 billion a year to the economy and employs 861,000 people. In 2022, startup ecosystems in Sydney and Melbourne were valued at $34 billion. Australia ranked 22nd in the Global Innovation Index 2025.

With only 0.3% of the world's population, Australia contributed over 4% of the world's published research in 2020, making it one of the top 10 research contributors in the world. CSIRO, Australia's national science agency, contributes 10% of all research in the country, while the rest is carried out by universities. Australian achievements include the invention of atomic absorption spectroscopy, the essential components of Wi-Fi technology, and the development of the first commercially successful polymer banknote. As of 2026, 14 Australian scientists have been awarded the Nobel Prize in physics, chemistry or medicine, and two have been awarded the Fields Medal.

Facilities supporting space exploration include the Square Kilometre Array and Australia Telescope Compact Array radio telescopes, telescopes such as the Siding Spring Observatory, and ground stations such as the Canberra Deep Space Communication Complex.

== Infrastructure ==
=== Transportation ===
A map of major roads in Australia. Roads are the main method of transport in Australia.

Australia's total transport activity contributed 7.9% to GDP in 2020–21, being highly dependent on road transport. It is estimated that roads contribute to more than A$245 billion, to the economic activity, significantly serving to agriculture, forestry, fishing, manufacturing and construction industries. There are more than 300 airports with paved runways. Passenger rail transport includes widespread commuter networks in the major capital cities with more limited intercity and interstate networks. The Australian mining sector is reliant upon rail to transport its product to Australia's ports for export.

=== Energy ===
Australian renewable power plants

The Australian economy is dependent on imported crude oil and petroleum products, the economy's petroleum import dependency is around 80%—crude oil + petroleum products.

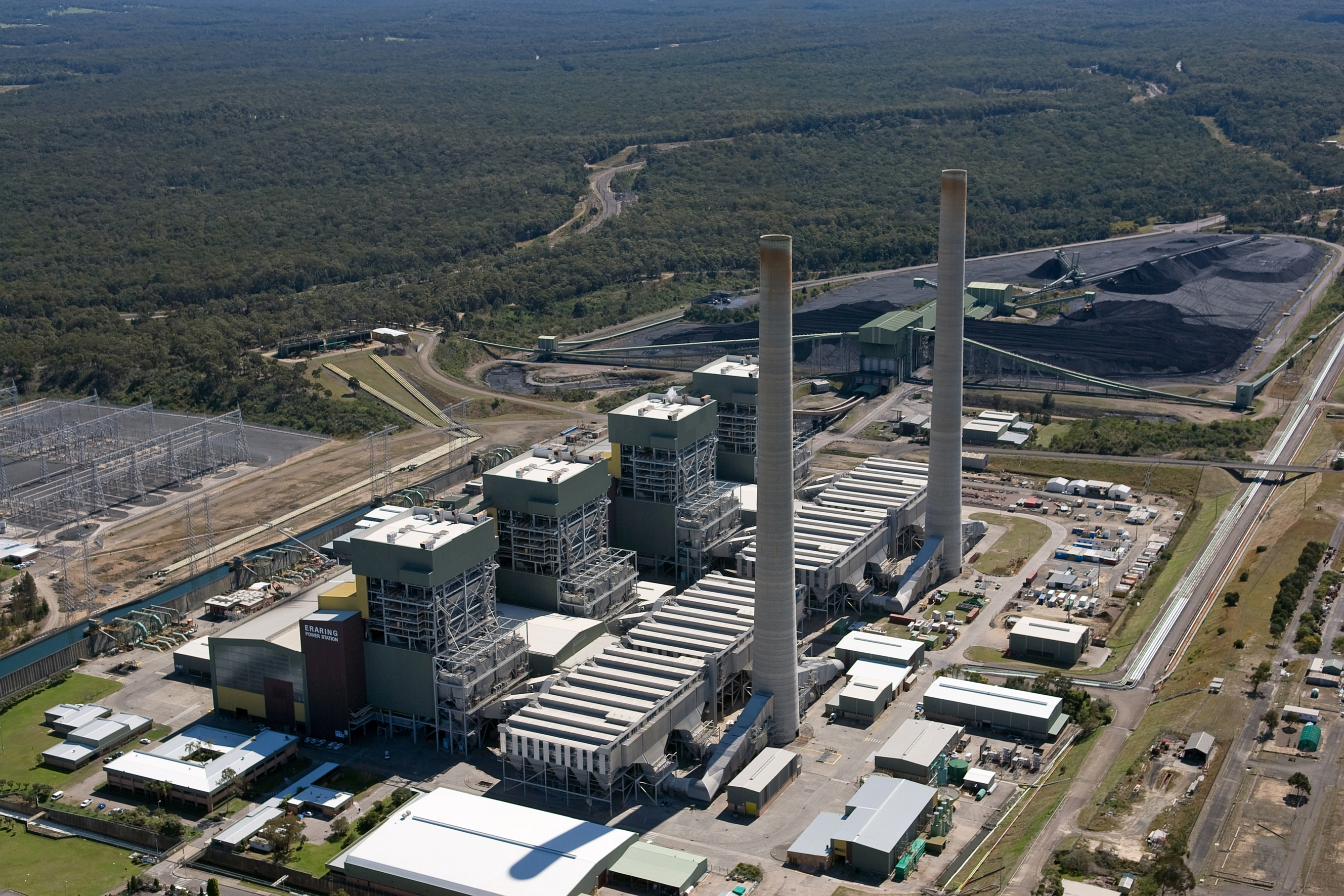
Eraring coal fired power station, Australia's largest power station

Energy consumption by source, Australia

Energy in Australia is the production in Australia of energy and electricity, for consumption or export. Energy policy of Australia describes the politics of Australia as it relates to energy.

In 2021, Australia was a net energy exporter and one of the largest exporters in the world of liquefied natural gas (LNG), coal, and minerals.

Energy consumption is dominated by oil and other fossil fuels, however, recently, due to the increasing effects of global warming and human-induced climate change on the global environment, there has been a shift towards renewable energy such as solar power and wind power both in Australia and abroad. In 2025, renewable energy accounted for 42.7% of the total amount of electricity generated in Australia.

==== Electricity ====
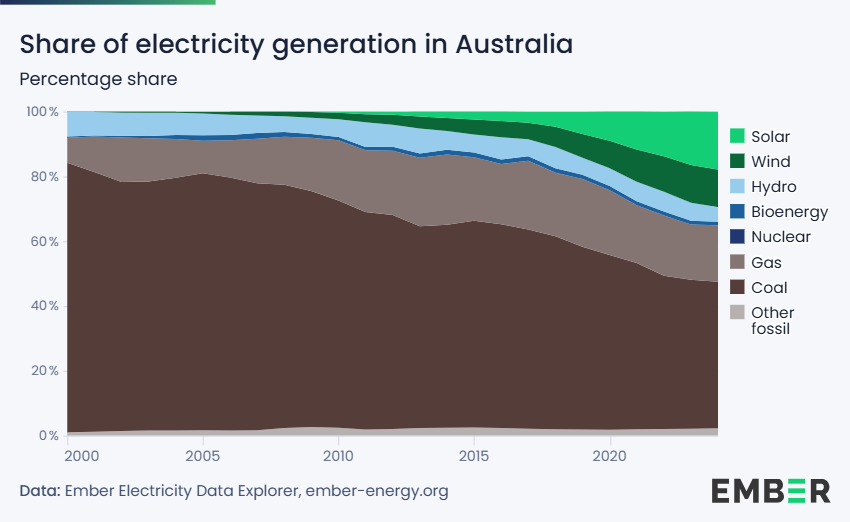
Share of electricity generation in Australia - percentage share

The electricity sector in Australia has been historically dominated by coal-fired power stations, but renewable fuels are forming a rapidly growing fraction of supply. In 2024, Australia's electricity production reached 265 TWh, with coal accounting for 52% and natural gas for 7.6%. Renewable sources, comprising solar, wind, hydro, and bioenergy with waste, collectively made up 40% of the total electricity generation mix.

Due to its large size and the location of its population, Australia lacks a single grid that covers all states, but has a transmission grid that extends along the east coast from Queensland via New South Wales and Victoria to South Australia and also connects via the Basslink submarine DC cable with Tasmania.

Since 2005, wind power and rooftop solar have led to a fast growing share of renewable energy in total electricity generation. Generation from renewable sources reached a share of 32.5 per cent in 2021, an increase from 16.9 per cent in 2017.

The Australian Government is advancing various reforms through its Powering Australia plan, with a goal for renewables to constitute 82% of the national electricity mix by 2030. This initiative is a key part of the government's broader strategy to lower emissions by 43% from 2005 levels by 2030, aiming for net zero emissions by 2050.

=== Water supply and sanitation ===
Water supply and sanitation in Australia is a topic concerning the consumption and obtainment of water for the Australian population. Being the driest inhabited continent in the world, and also one of the highest consumers of water per capita, both the acquisition and usage of water are of concern to Australians. Issues such as climate change and global warming are expected to impact the supply of water in Australia in the future, which can lead to severe consequences such as prolonged droughts.

Historically, Australia's variable rainfall levels have caused the construction of various dams and reservoirs in major water systems, to ensure that a consistent water supply exists for its population. The Murray-Darling river, Australia's largest river by capacity, supplies 55% of the total water usage in Australia, and is primarily used for agriculture in South Australia, New South Wales, and Victoria. Other prominent water sources have included groundwater, desalinated marine water, and recycled water.

The government management of water supply and distribution are a responsibility of each state government. State-owned companies are in charge of service provision in Western Australia, South Australia and the Northern Territory, while utilities owned by local governments provide services in parts of Queensland and Tasmania. In Victoria, New South Wales and Southeast Queensland, state-owned utilities provide bulk water which is then distributed by utilities owned by either local or state governments. The Minister for Water is responsible for water policies at the federal level.

Restrictions on water usage have been implemented at various points in Australia's history, in response to widespread droughts. Policies involve the prohibition of water usage for non-essential purposes, such as sprinklers and car washing. In less urgent times, residents are still encouraged to conserve water and apply practices such as effluent reuse, rainwater harvesting and using greywater for various applicable purposes. Larger scale projects in wastewater reclamation have been discussed in many major cities and successfully applied in Adelaide and Brisbane.

In 2006, Perth became the first Australian city to operate a seawater desalination plant, the Kwinana Desalination Plant, to reduce the city's vulnerability to droughts. Additional plants followed for major cities around Australia, such as

- Kurnell which supplies Sydney metropolitan area during droughts and low dam levels
- Gold Coast Desalination Plant supplying the Gold Coast and additionally the South East Queensland area by the SEQ Water Grid
- Victorian Desalination Plant supplying Melbourne metropolitan area.
- Adelaide Desalination Plant with capacity to supply up to 50% of Adelaide's water requirements.

== Trade and economic performance ==
Australia Free trade agreements in force

In the second half of the 20th century, Australian trade shifted away from Europe and North America to Japan and other East Asian markets. Regional franchising businesses, now a $128 billion sector, have been operating co-branded sites overseas for years with new investors coming from Western Australia and Queensland.

In the late 19th century, Australia's economic strength relative to the rest of the world was reflected in its GDP. In 1870, Australia had the highest GDP per capita in the world due to economic growth fuelled by its natural resources. However, as Australia's population grew rapidly over the 20th century, its GDP per capita dropped relative to countries such as the US and Norway. However, the Australian economy has been performing nominally better than other economies of the OECD and has supported economic growth for over 20 consecutive years. According to the Reserve Bank of Australia, Australian per capita GDP growth is higher than that of New Zealand, US, Canada and The Netherlands. The past performance of the Australian economy has been heavily influenced by US, Japanese and Chinese economic growth.

=== Australian national debt ===
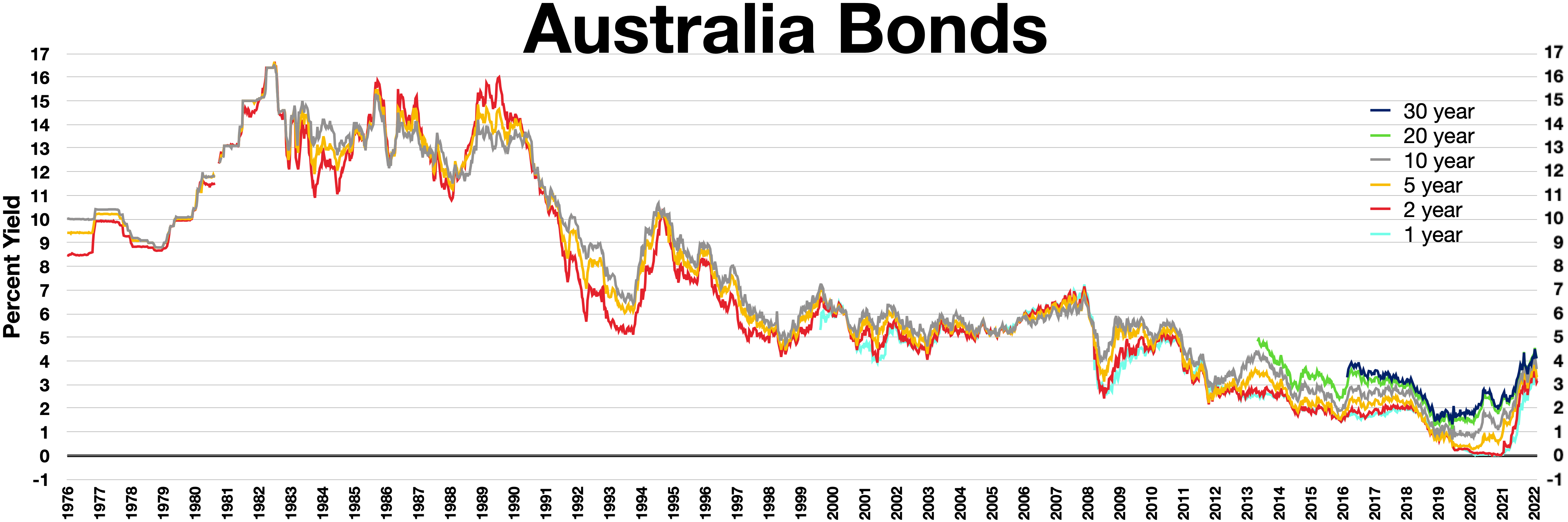
Australia bonds 30 year 20 year 10 year 5 year 2 year 1 year

Australia's net external debt exceeded $1 trillion in April 2017 as a result of Australia's structural current account deficits. Although these deficits have narrowed over the last decade due to an increase in net merchandise trade, this effect has been partly offset by the return of Australian government debt; net federal debt was estimated at $326.0 billion in the 2016–17 federal budget of which 60% is owed to foreigners. The entirety of the debt has been accumulated through ten straight budget deficits as Australia had negative net government debt (i.e. The Australian government had net positive bond holdings) a decade earlier in the 2006–07 fiscal year.

=== Chinese investment ===
There is substantial export to China of iron ore, wool and other raw materials, and over 120,000 Chinese students study in Australian schools and universities. China is the largest purchaser of Australian debt. In 2009, offers were made by state-owned Chinese companies to invest $22 billion in Australia's resource extraction industry.

The Signing of the China-Australia Free Trade Agreement in November 2014, has the potential to drastically increase Chinese Investments as agriculture and services become more lenient.

Australia's special investor visa program introduced in 2012 encouraged Chinese investment. The visa program fast-tracks visas and eases the residency requirement for a permanent visa for those ready to invest over five million Australian dollars into state government bonds, specific infrastructure and property investments. Wealthy Chinese interested in direct investment began looking to Australia after Canada started scaling back its investment visa program in 2012 and eliminated its main investor visa program in 2014. In early 2014 it was reported that the Australia's special investor visa was granted to 65 mostly Chinese millionaires who brought over $440 million into the country. By 2017, almost 90% of the more than 1,300 foreigners who used Australia's special investor visa program were from China. Australia also has an investor visa program with a required investment of one million Australian dollars but with more restrictions and a lengthier period of time to get a permanent visa.

In 2017, it was reported that Australia is the third-most popular destination for Chinese to invest wealth offshore, with a 7% increase in Chinese private wealth flowing into Australia while interest in the top two investment destinations, Hong Kong and the United States, fell by 18% and 3%, respectively. In 2017 there were 1.6 million high-net-worth Chinese (with at least 10 million Chinese yuan to invest) and 24 per cent of the 3,000 wealthy Chinese surveyed had private investments in Australia. Migration was one of the top three reasons for Chinese investment offshore.

In 2018, in the Lowy Institute poll there had a sharp rise in the proportion of the Australian population who say the Australian government is "allowing too much investment from China".

This number rose from 56 per cent in 2014 to 72 per cent in 2018.

=== Australia's balance of payments ===
Australia's current account (in $M) since 1959

Australia's current account as a proportion of GDP since 1959

In trade terms, the Australian economy has had persistently large current account deficits (CADs) for more than 50 years. One of the factors that undermines balance of payments is Australia's export base, making it highly vulnerable to the volatility in the prices of commodity goods. In addition, due to a colonial heritage a lot of companies operating in Australia are foreign-owned and, as a result, Australia's net income outlay between it and the rest of the world is always negative; this results in persistent current account deficits even when there is a positive export.

Dependent upon commodities, the Australian government endeavoured to redevelop the Australian manufacturing sector. This initiative, also known as microeconomic reform, helped Australian manufacturing to grow from 10.1% in 1983–1984 to 17.8% in 2003–2004.

There are other factors that have contributed to the extremely high current account deficit in Australia such as lack of international competitiveness.

However, as Australia's CAD is almost entirely generated by the private sector, as outlined in Professor John Pitchford's 'Consenting Adults Thesis' in the early 1990s, there is an argument that the CAD is not a significant issue. Historically, Australia has relied on overseas capital to fill the gap between domestic savings and investment, and many of these investment opportunities could not have been pursued if Australia did not have access to foreign savings. This suggests that Australia's apparently low savings level and CAD are not necessarily a significant problem. As long as the investment that is being funded by overseas capital inflow generates sufficient returns to pay for the servicing costs in the future, the increase in foreign liabilities can be viewed as sustainable in the longer term.

=== Personal wealth ===
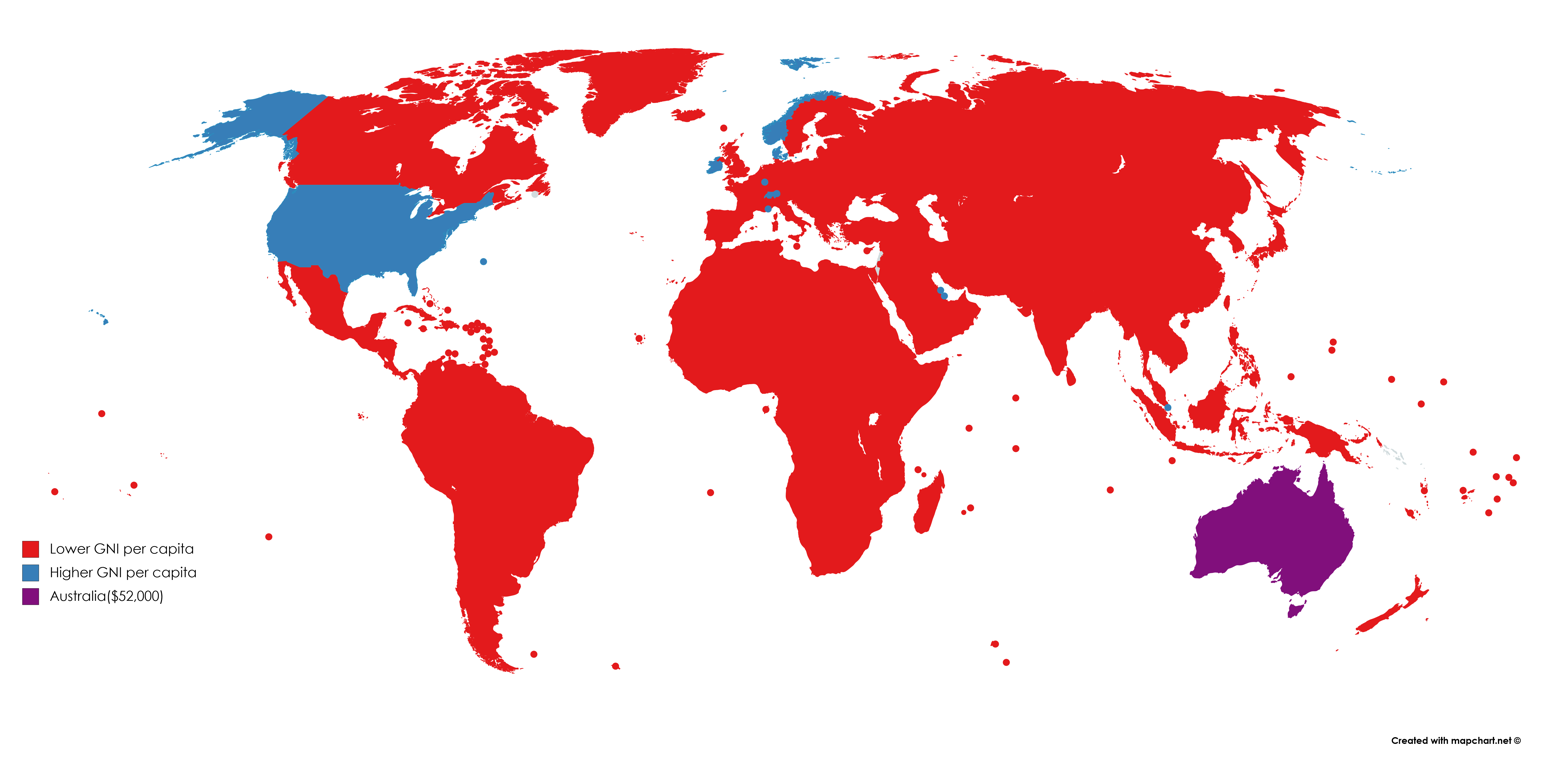
GNI per capita in 2015

According to the 2011 Credit Suisse Global Wealth report, Australia's wealth per adult had quadrupled over the past decade, and its total wealth was US$6.4 trillion. In the report Australia was the second-wealthiest country in the world behind Switzerland based on average wealth per adult, and had the highest median wealth in the world (US$222,000, nearly four times the amount of each US adult) and a proportion of people with wealth above US$100,000 that was eight times the world average. This was attributed to a resilient Australian dollar, property ownership levels and a strong labour market. Compared to the rest of the world, very few Australians had a net worth of less than US$1,000, which was attributed to relatively low credit card and student loan debt. In 2013, Australia was identified by the Credit Suisse as retaining its 2012 position as the nation with the second-highest average wealth per adult (US$403,000); however, the nation's poverty rate was also reported to have increased from 10.2% in 2000–01 to 11.8% at the time of the 2013 report on global wealth.

Despite the economic slowdown, in the 2014 Credit Suisse Global Wealth Report, Australia continued to have the second-highest average wealth per adult (US$430,800) and the highest median wealth (US$225,400), with a total wealth of $7.2 trillion. The average level of real assets (US$319,700) was the second-highest in the world after Norway and 60% of gross household assets. The report explained that this partly reflects a large endowment of land and natural resources relative to population, and also high urban real estate prices. Only 6% of Australians had a net worth below US$10,000, compared to 29% in the US and 70% for the world as a whole. The average debt was 20% of gross assets. The proportion of people with wealth above US$100,000 was the highest in the world (eight times the world average). Australia had 3.8% (1,783,000 people) of the top 1% of global wealth holders while having 0.4% of the world's adult population. The wealth share by Australia's top decile was 51.1% in 2000, 50.7% in 2007, and 51.1% in 2014. In 2016, Australia continued to be the second-wealthiest nation in terms of wealth per adult.

In 2017, Australia was the world's top destination for millionaires, beating the United States for the second consecutive year. An estimated 11,000 millionaires moved to Australia in 2016, compared with the 10,000 who moved to the United States. Australia was especially attractive to Chinese millionaires due to its relative proximity, cleaner environment, political and economic stability, and investor visa programs. Also, the primary reason for millionaires leaving China is top schools abroad that will give their children a better education and career connections.

=== Mergers and acquisitions ===
All in all over 43,150 deals have been completed national, inbound or outbound Australia. This cumulates to an overall value of US$2,554 billion. There was a strong upward trend between 1989 and 2007. In this peak year almost 3,100 deals took place, which is almost 60% more than in 2017, the current low. Australian companies are particularly investing in the fields of metals and minerals (15% of all deals from Australia into foreign countries). Runner-up is the oil and gas industry with only 6.4%.

Here is a list of the top 10 deals with participation of Australian companies as the acquirer or target company:

Date	Acquirer name	Acquirer industry	Acquirer nation	Target name	Target industry	Target country	Value in US$mill
December 2017	Unibail-Rodamco	Commercial real estate	Europe	Westfield Corporation	Commercial real estate, shopping centres	Australia	24,800.00
May 2008	Westpac Banking Corp	Banking	Australia	St George Bank Ltd	Banking	Australia	17,932.98
July 2007	Wesfarmers Ltd	Food & beverage retailing	Australia	Coles Group Ltd	Food & beverage retailing	Australia	15,287.79
October 2006	Kemble Water Ltd	Other Financials	Australia	Thames Water PLC	Water and waste management	United Kingdom	14,888.80
October 2006	Cemex SAB de CV	Construction materials	Mexico	Rinker Group Ltd	Construction materials	Australia	14,247.73
October 2016	Investor Group	Other Financials	Australia	Ausgrid Pty Ltd	Power	Australia	12,499.92
March 2001	BHP Ltd	Metals & mining	Australia	Billiton PLC	Metals & mining	United Kingdom	11,510.99
June 2011	SABMiller Beverage Investments	Other Financials	Australia	Foster's Group Ltd	Food and beverage	Australia	10,792.76
December 1996	Investors	Other Financials	Australia	Telstra Corp Ltd	Telecommunications services	Australia	9,976.59
November 2010	Shareholders	Other Financials	Australia	Westfield Group-Assets(54)	Non-residential	Australia	9,482.42

== Poverty ==
In 2022 ACOSS released a report revealing that poverty is growing in Australia, with an estimated 3.3 million people, or 13.5% of the population, living below the internationally accepted poverty line of 50% of a country's median income. It also estimated that there are 761,000 (17.7%) children under the age of 15 that are in poverty. Indigenous Australians face significantly higher poverty rates, with 30% of Indigenous households in income poverty, emerging as the most socially and economically deprived group in Australia.

== Homelessness ==
There were 105,237 people experiencing homelessness in Australia on census night in 2011. This equated to 1 in 200 Australians, and represented an increase of 17% from the 2006 census, with the rate of homelessness increasing from 45 per 10,000 to 49 per 10,000.

The number of homeless people in Australia jumped by more than 14,000—or 14 per cent—in the five years to 2016, according to census data. The Australian Bureau of Statistics (ABS) said 116,000 people were homeless on census night in 2016, representing 50 homeless people per 10,000.

== Climate change ==
According to the Climate Commission (now the Climate Council) report in 2013, the extreme heatwaves, flooding and bushfires striking Australia have been intensified by climate change and will get worse in future in terms of their impacts on people, property, communities and the environment. The summer of 2012/2013 included the hottest summer, hottest month and hottest day on record. The cost of the 2009 bushfires in Victoria was estimated at A$4.4bn (£3bn) and the Queensland floods of 2010/2011 cost over A$5bn.

In 2008 the Treasurer and the Minister for Climate Change and Water released a report that concluded the economy will grow with an emissions trading scheme in place.

A report released in October 2009 by the Standing Committee on Climate Change, Water, Environment and the Arts, studying the effects of a 1-metre sea level rise, quite possible within the next 30–60 years, concluded that around 700,000 properties around Australia, including 80,000 buildings, would be inundated, the collective value of these properties is estimated at $155 billion.

In 2019 the Australian Bureau of Agricultural and Resource Economics and Sciences published a report about the impact of climate change on the profitability of the Australian agriculture, saying that the profit of the Australian farms was cut by 22% due to climate change in the years 2000–2019.

According to the 2022 IPCC report Australia will lose billions of dollars due to loss of life, and physical damages. These natural disasters are caused by climate change and increasing global warming will worsen these events. The report estimates that under 2 degrees of warming Australia will lose $115 billion in the next decade, and $350 billion in the next twenty years. If warming goes up to under 3 degrees of warming Australia's economy will lose $200 billion and $600 billion by 2042.

==== Agriculture forestry and livestock ====
Small changes caused by global warming, such as a longer growing season, a more temperate climate and increased CO_{2} concentrations, may benefit Australian crop agriculture and forestry in the short term. However, such benefits are unlikely to be sustained with increasingly severe effects of global warming. Changes in precipitation and consequent water management problems will further exacerbate Australia's current water availability and quality challenges, both for commercial and residential use.

The CSIRO predicts that the additional results in Australia of a temperature rise of between 3 and 4 °C will be:

- 32% possibility of diminished wheat production (without adaptation).
- 45% probability of wheat crop value being beneath present levels (without adaptation).
- 55% of primary habitat lost for Eucalyptus.
- 25–50% rise in common timber yield in cool and wet parts of South Australia.
- 25–50% reduction in common timber yield in North Queensland and the Top End.
- 6% decrease in Australian net primary production (for 20% precipitation decrease)
- 128% increase in tick-associated losses in net cattle production weight.

==== Electricity demand ====
Use of domestic air conditioners during severe heatwaves can double electricity demand, placing great stress on electricity generation and transmission networks, and lead to load shedding. In addition, bushfires can damage electricity lines, while repairing power poles and power line damages is often restricted during hot and dry weather because of high fire risks.

== See also ==
- List of companies of Australia
- Australia and the World Bank
- Australian Chamber of Commerce and Industry
- Australian corporate law
- Australian Made logo
- Australian Securities Exchange
- Corruption in Australia
- List of trade unions in Australia
- List of Australian states and territories by gross state product
- Median household income in Australia and New Zealand
- Privatisation in Australia
- Ranked list of states and territories of Australia
- Reserve Bank of Australia

== Sources ==
- Joint Standing Committee on Foreign Affairs, Defence and Trade (2015). Principles and Practice - Australian Defence Industry and Exports. Canberra: Parliament of Australia. ISBN 978-1-74366-316-5.
