= Australian Office of Financial Management =

Australian government agency

The Australian Office of Financial Management (AOFM) is a part of the Australian Department of the Treasury. It manages the Australian government's debt portfolio. Its reports on debt management directed at ensuring that the Commonwealth debt portfolio is managed at least cost, subject to the Government's policies and risk references.

== History ==
The AOFM was established in 1999 as the sovereign debt manager of Australia, and borrows on behalf of the Australian government. This is done through Australian Government Securities (AGS), which had also been called Commonwealth Government Securities. As of June 2023, the outstanding value of the AGS issued by the AOFM was at $889.8 billion.

The head of the agency in June 2021 was Rob Nicholl. According to the AFR, Nicholls was the "leading force" behind sourcing $300 billion from international investors to finance the government's stimulus program during the Covid-19 pandemic.

In 2023, the AOFM alleged that the bank ANZ had been misreporting bond trading data concerning bonds issued by the AOFM that it had been assigned to manage. This led to ANZ being investigated by the Australian Securities and Investments Commission (ASIC). In 2024, ANZ admitted "unacceptable failure" on the matter, and that its CEO had apologized to the AOFM. The incident led to greater political scrutiny of Australian banks and several policy changes, according to S&P Global in 2025. AOFM subsequently froze ANZ out of all government bond deals, before re-engaging the bank over possibly refinancing of $80 billion of Covid-19 debt.

An audit of the AOFM by the Australian National Audit Office that was published on February 22, 2024 founded that the AOFM was "largely effective at managing costs and risks associated with Australian Government debt," and was also "largely effective" at managing the debt itself. The report also found that AOFM's governance arrangements with the Australian Treasury worked well, but that "the roles, responsibilities and accountabilities amongst key stakeholders in relation to debt management oversight and decision-making under the legislative framework are not transparent."

== Heads of the agency ==
The current CEO of the AOFM is Anna Hughes. In January 2023, Anna Hughes succeeded Rob Nicholl as CEO of AOFM, after Nicholl spent a decade in the role.
