= Haiti Reconstruction Fund =

International Financial Partnership

The Haiti Reconstruction Fund (HRF) is a partnership between the international community and the Government of Haiti to help finance post-earthquake reconstruction. The HRF mobilizes, coordinates and allocates contributions from bilateral and other donors to finance high-priority projects, programs and budget support. Proponents partner with the Inter-American Development Bank (IADB), the United Nations (UN) or the World Bank (WB) to ensure that international standards for quality, good governance and financial management are met. All proposals for HRF financing must be endorsed by the Interim Haiti Recovery Commission (IHRC) as consistent with the Action Plan for the Recovery and Development of Haiti.

== Donors ==
The initial donors to the HRF are Brazil, Norway, Australia, Colombia, and Estonia. The list of donor countries and the value of their contributions are expected to increase based on pledges made in international conferences held in Santo Domingo, New York City and Punta Cana. Resources are pooled, and are used for budget support and/or investments aligned with the Action Plan. All donors sign the same Administrative Agreement and no earmarking is allowed.
