= Australian federal budget =

Estimated revenues and expenditures

An Australian federal budget is a document that sets out the estimated revenues and expenditures of the Australian Treasury in the following financial year, proposed conduct of Australian government operations in that period, and its fiscal policy for the forward years. Budgets are called by the year in which they are presented to Parliament and relate to a financial year that commences on the following 1 July and ends on 30 June of the following year, so that the 2026 budget brought down in May 2026 relates to the 2026/27 financial year (1 July 2026 – 30 June 2027, FY2027).

Revenue estimates detailed in the budget are raised through the Australian taxation system, with government spending (including transfers to the states) representing a sizeable proportion of the overall economy. Besides presenting the government's expected revenues and expenditures, the federal budget is also a political statement of the government's intentions and priorities, and has profound macroeconomic implications.

Australia follows, to a great extent, the conventions of the Westminster system. For example, the prime minister must have the support of a majority in the House of Representatives, and must in any case be able to ensure the existence of no absolute majority against the government. In relation to the budget, that requires that if the House fails to pass the government's budget, even by one dollar, then the government must either resign so that a different government can be appointed or seek a parliamentary dissolution so that new general elections may be held in order to re-confirm or deny the government's mandate.

== Process ==
The process of putting together the budget begins in November when the Central Budget Management System (CBMS) is updated with the latest estimates, and the senior ministers' review, where the Prime Minister, Treasurer, and Minister for Finance meet to establish the policy priorities and strategy for the coming financial year.

The outcome of the senior ministers' review determines how the different portfolios will prepare their budget submissions for cabinet. Agencies within each portfolio do not submit a request for new funding, because their potential savings within the agency are unfounded. After Finance has agreed to the costings, the submissions are circulated for coordination comments and lodged with the cabinet office by late February.

The Expenditure Review Committee (ERC), a committee of Cabinet, meets in March to consider all submissions. They decide which proposals will be funded and the level of funding each will receive. At the end of the ERC, the ad hoc revenue committee meets to make decisions on the revenue streams of the budget. A pre-budget review of the estimates is conducted after all decisions have been finalised to ensure that they are reflected in CBMS.

Budget documentation commences at the end of the ERC process. Agencies prepare two components: the portfolio budget statements and the mid-year economic and fiscal outlook.

The portfolio budget statements provide additional details and explanations of the budget and the statement of risks, which is included in Budget Paper No. 1.

=== Legislation ===
Proceedings for the budget usually begin at 7:30 pm with the Speaker announcing that the Governor-General has recommended an appropriation of revenue in accordance with Appropriation Bill (No. 1), this step is required by the Constitution. Following the Governor-General's message, the Treasurer will present the Appropriation Bill (No. 1) to the House of Representatives. After the Treasurer presents the bill to the House, the first reading will occur, this only involves the clerk of the House reading the bill's long title. Following the first reading, the Treasurer will move the second reading which contains the budget speech outlining policy and fiscal measures for the coming year, the Treasurer is not limited by standing orders in how long they can speak for. Following the second reading, debate is adjourned by the Leader of the Opposition who has the right to speak first when debate is resumed. The opposition leader's budget reply is televised like the Treasurer's speech. Following the adjournment of debate on Appropriation Bill (No. 1), the Treasurer presents additional budget papers. Appropriation Bill (No. 2) and the Appropriation (Parliamentary Departments) Bill are usually introduced by the Assistant Treasurer, at the same time customs and excise tariff proposals may be presented to the House, ministerial statements explaining the budget may be made, additional legislation may be moved or budget-related documents may be distributed. Debate on Appropriation Bill (No. 1) usually continues over several weeks and is known as the "budget debate", the scope of debate is not limited to the contents of the legislation as the appropriation bills are exempt from standing orders. When the bill's second reading has been agreed to, the bill will be considered in detail, the House will consider the schedule of funds being appropriated before they considering other clauses, most debate usually takes place within the Federation Chamber.

After the appropriation bills pass the House of Representatives, they must be passed in the Senate similar to other legislation, the Senate may consider proposed expenditures before the bills are introduced. When the budget is presented to the House, the minister representing the Treasurer in the Senate tables budget documents and related documents excluding the bills, details of proposed expenditure are referred to the Senate's legislation committees for the Budget Estimates hearings. During budget estimates hearings, senators are able to question representatives of government departments, this usually speeds up the passage of the budget bills in the Senate because of the chamber's extended consideration of the details.

According to the Constitution, taxation bills cannot be amended by or originate in the Senate. About 25% of government expenditure is authorised by appropriation bills, the remaining 75% is authorised by "special appropriation bills", this can take the form of legislation passed after the budget. Government expenditure can only be authorised by legislation approved by Parliament, this means that taxes cannot be raised without Parliament's approval, passing legislation to appropriate finances is often known as "supply". Although Parliament has the ultimate power to approve or deny any appropriation of money, the government has a "financial initiative", this means that only the government can request that an appropriation or taxation be increased or decreased, this is because the Governor-General only acts on the advice of the government and a message must be transmitted from the Governor-General before appropriations can be passed through Parliament. If the appropriation bills cannot be passed through Parliament, the government can pass supply bills to provide funds in the interim.

== Charter of Budget Honesty Act ==
The budget has to be presented within the framework that has been established by the Charter of Budget Honesty Act 1998.

The charter provides for:

- sound fiscal management of the Australian economy
- open dissemination about the status of public finances
- transparency in Australia's fiscal policy

== Budget night ==
Between 1901 and 1993, the practice was for the budget to be brought down in August, on the first Tuesday night of the Spring session.

Since 1994, the Treasurer has presented the budget on the second Tuesday in May, with the exceptions of 1996 (due to an election and a change of government in March, the budget was brought down in August), 2016 (it was held on the first Tuesday in May to allow the government to potentially call a double dissolution election following the presentation of the budget), 2019 (when an election called for 18 May caused the budget to be brought forward to 2 April), 2020 (when it was postponed to October due to the COVID-19 pandemic and 2022 (when an election called for May caused the budget to be brought forward to 29 March).

On budget day, but before the presentation of the budget, the Treasurer spends the day behind locked doors briefing media and interest groups on various aspects of the budget. This is known as the budget lock-up. Because of the market sensitive nature of some of the information which they are being provided, those invited to attend the briefings are not allowed access to the outside world until the budget has been presented in Parliament by the Treasurer, which normally commences at 7.30 pm.

In modern times, the budget has been broadcast live from Parliament House on the ABC and Sky News. It is hosted on the ABC, without interruption from 7:30 pm to 8 pm, normally followed up with a report by a panel assessing the changes, benefits and flaws in the budget. Additional budget documents and materials are available on the government budget website for other interested parties.

A convention in Australian politics is that the Leader of the Opposition is given a "right of reply", which they deliver in Parliament two days after the government's budget speech, and which is also broadcast on television.

== See also ==
- Australian Government Future Fund
- Australian government debt
- Commonwealth Grants Commission
- Fiscal imbalance in Australia
- Taxation in Australia

International:

- Government budget by country
