= Treasurer of Australia =

Australian government minister in charge of economic policy

- Commonwealth Coat of Arms

- Flag of Australia

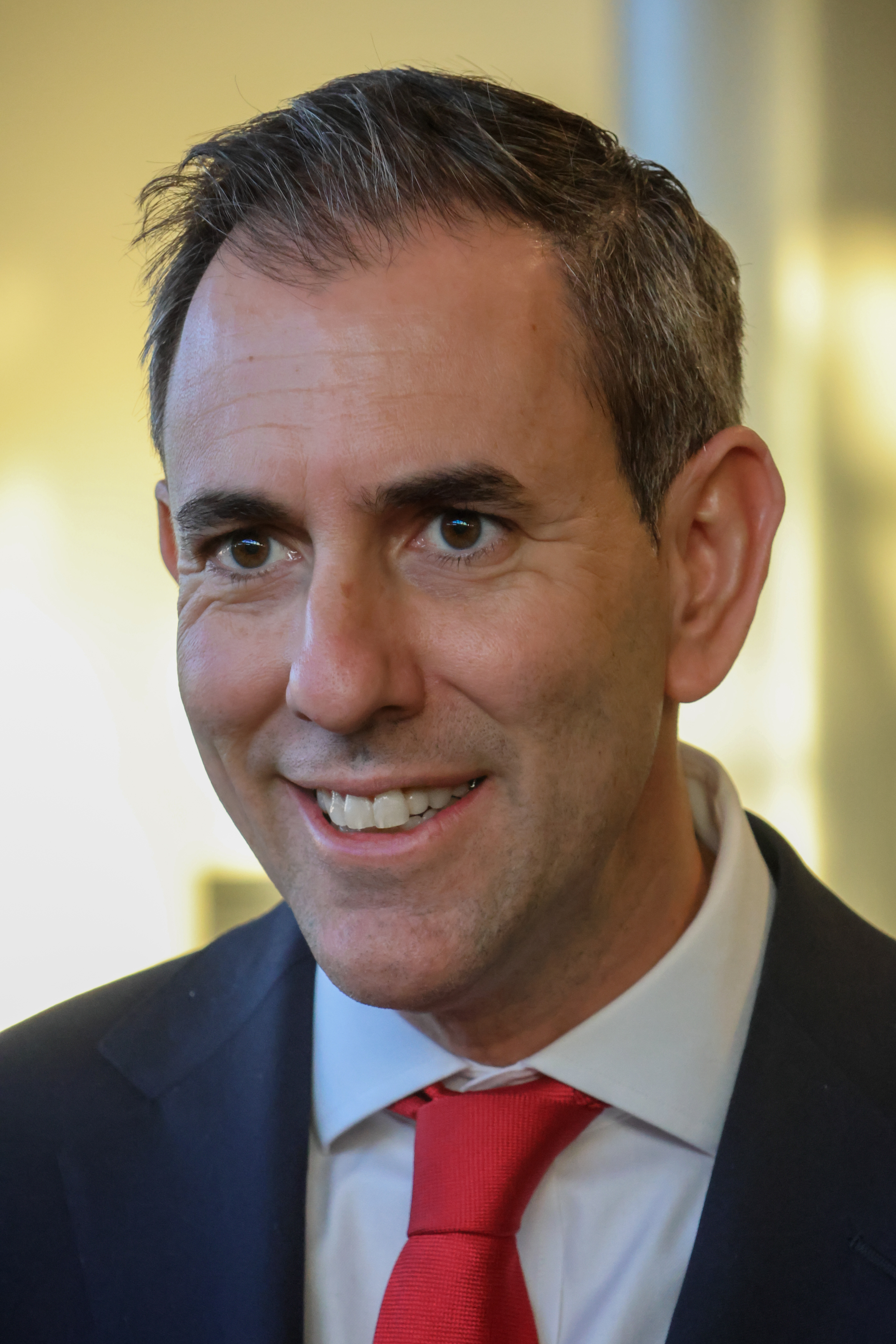
- Incumbent; Jim Chalmers since 23 May 2022
- Department of the Treasury
- Style: The Honourable
- Member of: Cabinet; Federal Executive Council; National Security Committee
- Seat: Canberra, ACT
- Appointer: Governor-General; on the advice of the prime minister
- Term length: At the Governor-General's pleasure
- Formation: 1 January 1901
- First holder: Sir George Turner
- Website: ministers.treasury.gov.au/ministers/jim-chalmers-2022

The treasurer of Australia, also known as the federal treasurer or more simply the treasurer, is the minister of state of the Commonwealth of Australia charged with overseeing government revenue collection, federal expenditure and economic policy as the head of the Department of the Treasury. The current treasurer is Jim Chalmers, who was selected by Prime Minister Anthony Albanese in May 2022 following the 2022 Australian federal election.

The treasurer implements ministerial powers through the Department of the Treasury and a range of other government agencies. According to constitutional convention, the treasurer is always a member of the Parliament of Australia with a seat in the House of Representatives. The office is generally seen as equivalent to the chancellor of the Exchequer in the United Kingdom or the secretary of the treasury in the United States or, in some other countries, the finance minister. It is one of only four ministerial positions (along with prime minister, minister for defence and attorney-general) that have existed since federation.

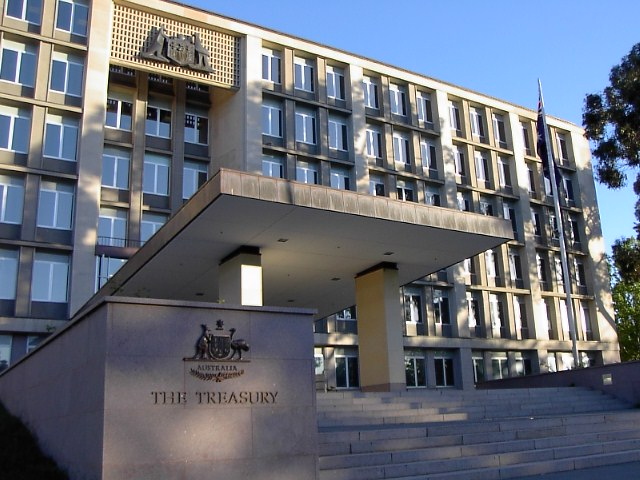
The Department of the Treasury, Canberra

== Responsibilities and duties ==
The Treasurer is the minister in charge of government revenue and expenditure. The Treasurer oversees economic policy: fiscal policy is within the Treasurer's direct responsibility, while monetary policy is implemented by the politically independent Reserve Bank of Australia, the head of which is appointed by the Treasurer. The Treasurer also oversees financial regulation. Each year in May, the Treasurer presents the Federal Budget to the Parliament.

The Prime Minister and Treasurer are traditionally members of the House, but the constitution does not have such a requirement. The tradition is due to the fact that under the constitution, appropriation bills have to originate from the House, and if the Treasurer is a senator, they would not be able to introduce the bills. This would also mean another minister would need to give the nationally televised budget speech and introduce the bills. While no Federal Treasurer has been a member of the Senate, New South Wales, Victoria, Tasmania and South Australia had state Treasurers who had served as members of the Legislative Councils, the states' upper houses.

Unlike the scenario in which a treasurer who is a senator cannot present the budget in the House of Representatives, state treasurers who have been members of upper houses have delivered their budgets in the respective lower houses.

The treasurer is a very senior government post, usually ranking second or third in Cabinet. Historically, many treasurers have previously, concurrently or subsequently served as prime minister or deputy prime minister; two subsequently served as Governor-General. Service as treasurer is seen as an important (though not essential) qualification for serving as prime minister: to date, six treasurers have gone on to be prime minister.

Paul Keating and Wayne Swan are currently the only two to have been named "Euromoney Finance Minister of the Year" by Euromoney magazine.

Since 1958, Treasurers in Coalition governments have often but not always been the deputy leader of the Liberal Party. In contrast, only four Labor Treasurers have also been the deputy leader of the Labor Party.

== Related ministerial positions ==
Along with the Treasurer, other ministers have responsibility for the Department of the Treasury. The Treasurer together with these other ministers are known as the "Treasury Ministers". At present, the Treasury Minister positions are:

- Treasurer
- Assistant Treasurer
- Minister for Financial Services
- Minister for Small Business
- Minister for Housing
- Minister for Homelessness
- Minister for Cities

The work of the Department of Finance is closely related to the work of the Department of the Treasury, with the former responsible for budget formation and operational management of government finances. The ministers who have responsibility for the Department of Finance are:

- Minister for Finance
- Special Minister of State

== Treasury portfolio ==
Eleven organizations nominally fall under the auspices of the Australian Treasurer. They entail the provision of policy advice to portfolio ministers; effective government spending and taxation arrangements; and well-functioning markets.

- The Department of the Treasury creates policies and reports for four output groups. These groups are macroeconomic, fiscal, revenue and markets:
  - Macroeconomic reports include: domestic economic policy advice and forecasting and international economic policy advice and assessment.
  - Fiscal reports include: budget policy advice and coordination; Commonwealth-State financial policy advice; and industry, environment and social policy advice.
  - Revenue reports include: taxation and income support policy advice.
  - Markets reports include: foreign investment policy advice and administration; financial corporate governance policy advice; competition and consumer policy advice; and actuarial services. In addition, the Royal Australian Mint is responsible for producing Australia's circulating currency.
- The Australian Bureau of Statistics is Australia's official statistical agency. Its reports are created for decision-making, research and discussion within governments and the community. It principally relates to the production of economic, population and social statistics.
- The Australian Office of Financial Management manages the Commonwealth's net debt portfolio. Its reports on debt management directed at ensuring that the Commonwealth net debt portfolio is managed, subject to the government's policies and risk references.
- The National Competition Council is an independent advisory body for all Australian governments involved in implementing the National Competition Policy. Outputs include: advice provided to governments on competition policy and infrastructure access issues and accessible public information on competition policy.
- The Productivity Commission is an advisory body on microeconomics policy that contributes to public understanding.
- The Australian Taxation Office outputs are directed at systems that support and fund services for Australians and give effect to social and economic policy through the tax, superannuation, excise and other related systems. Outputs include: design and build administrative systems; management of revenue collection and transfers; compliance assurance; and regulation of superannuation funds compliance with retirement income standards. The Inspector-General of Taxation is an independent statutory office to review systemic tax administration issues and to report to the Government with recommendations for improving tax administration for the benefit of taxpayers.
- The Australian Competition and Consumer Commission is a regulation agency mandated for consumer rights by industry regulation and price monitoring.
- The Australian Prudential Regulation Authority is the financial supervisor responsible for prudentially regulating the banking, other deposit-taking, insurance and superannuation industries.
- The Australian Securities and Investments Commission (ASIC) is the independent government body that enforces and administers the Corporations Law and Consumer Protection Law for investments, life and general insurance, and superannuation and banking (except lending). Outputs include: policy, enforcement and guidance about ASIC-administered laws; information on companies and corporate activity; and monitoring and licensing of participants.
- The Corporations and Markets Advisory Committee (CAMAC) creates reports directed at participation of investors and consumers. It makes recommendations to the responsible Minister on the Corporations Law, and produces and publishes an annual report along with other discussion papers and reports.

== List of treasurers ==
The following individuals have been appointed as Treasurer of Australia:

Order	Treasurer	Portrait	Party	Prime Minister	Term start	Term end	Term in office
1	Sir George Turner		Protectionist	Barton	1 January 1901	27 April 1904	3 years, 117 days
1	Sir George Turner		Protectionist	Deakin	1 January 1901	27 April 1904	3 years, 117 days
2	Chris Watson^{1}		Labour	Watson	27 April 1904	17 August 1904	112 days
(1)	Sir George Turner		Protectionist	Reid	17 August 1904	4 July 1905	321 days
3	Sir John Forrest		Protectionist	Deakin	4 July 1905	30 July 1907	2 years, 26 days
4	Sir William Lyne		Protectionist	Deakin	30 July 1907	13 November 1908	1 year, 106 days
5	Andrew Fisher^{1}		Labour	Fisher	13 November 1908	2 June 1909	201 days
(3)	Sir John Forrest		Commonwealth Liberal	Deakin	2 June 1909	29 April 1910	331 days
(5)	Andrew Fisher^{1}		Labour	Fisher	29 April 1910	24 June 1913	3 years, 56 days
(3)	Sir John Forrest		Commonwealth Liberal	Cook	24 June 1913	17 September 1914	1 year, 85 days
(5)	Andrew Fisher^{1}		Labor	Fisher	17 September 1914	27 October 1915	1 year, 40 days
6	William Higgs		Labor	Hughes	27 October 1915	14 November 1916	1 year, 18 days
7	Alexander Poynton		National Labor	Hughes	14 November 1916	17 February 1917	95 days
(3)	Sir John Forrest		Nationalist	Hughes	17 February 1917	27 March 1918	1 year, 38 days
8	William Watt		Nationalist	Hughes	27 March 1918	28 July 1920	2 years, 123 days
9	Sir Joseph Cook		Nationalist	Hughes	28 July 1920	21 December 1921	1 year, 146 days
10	Stanley Bruce		Nationalist	Hughes	21 December 1921	9 February 1923	1 year, 50 days
11	Earle Page		Country	Bruce	9 February 1923	22 October 1929	6 years, 255 days
12	Ted Theodore		Labor	Scullin	22 October 1929	9 July 1930	260 days
13	James Scullin^{1}		Labor	Scullin	9 July 1930	29 January 1931	204 days
(12)	Ted Theodore		Labor	Scullin	29 January 1931	6 January 1932	342 days
14	Joseph Lyons^{1}		United Australia	Lyons	6 January 1932	3 October 1935	3 years, 270 days
15	Richard Casey		United Australia	Lyons	3 October 1935	7 April 1939	3 years, 205 days
15	Richard Casey		United Australia	Page	7 April 1939	26 April 1939	3 years, 205 days
16	Robert Menzies^{1}		United Australia	Menzies	26 April 1939	14 March 1940	323 days
17	Percy Spender		United Australia	Menzies	14 March 1940	28 October 1940	228 days
18	Arthur Fadden^{1}		Country	Menzies	28 October 1940	29 August 1941	344 days
18	Arthur Fadden^{1}		Country	Fadden	29 August 1941	7 October 1941	344 days
19	Ben Chifley^{1}		Labor	Curtin	7 October 1941	6 July 1945	8 years, 73 days
19	Ben Chifley^{1}		Labor	Forde	6 July 1945	13 July 1945	8 years, 73 days
19	Ben Chifley^{1}		Labor	Chifley	13 July 1945	19 December 1949	8 years, 73 days
(18)	Sir Arthur Fadden		Country	Menzies	19 December 1949	10 December 1958	8 years, 356 days
20	Harold Holt		Liberal	Menzies	10 December 1958	26 January 1966	7 years, 47 days
21	William McMahon		Liberal	Holt	26 January 1966	19 December 1967	3 years, 290 days
21	William McMahon		Liberal	McEwen	19 December 1967	10 January 1968	3 years, 290 days
21	William McMahon		Liberal	Gorton	10 January 1968	12 November 1969	3 years, 290 days
22	Les Bury		Liberal		12 November 1969	10 March 1971	1 year, 130 days
22	Les Bury		Liberal	McMahon	10 March 1971	22 March 1971	1 year, 130 days
23	Billy Snedden		Liberal	McMahon	22 March 1971	5 December 1972	1 year, 258 days
24	Gough Whitlam^{1}		Labor	Whitlam	5 December 1972	19 December 1972	14 days
25	Frank Crean		Labor	Whitlam	19 December 1972	11 December 1974	1 year, 357 days
26	Jim Cairns		Labor	Whitlam	11 December 1974	6 June 1975	177 days
27	Bill Hayden		Labor	Whitlam	6 June 1975	11 November 1975	158 days
28	Phillip Lynch		Liberal	Fraser	11 November 1975	19 November 1977	2 years, 8 days
29	John Howard		Liberal	Fraser	19 November 1977	11 March 1983	5 years, 112 days
30	Paul Keating		Labor	Hawke	11 March 1983	3 June 1991	8 years, 84 days
31	Bob Hawke^{1}		Labor	Hawke	3 June 1991	4 June 1991	1 day
32	John Kerin		Labor	Hawke	4 June 1991	9 December 1991	189 days
33	Ralph Willis		Labor	Hawke	9 December 1991	20 December 1991	18 days
33	Ralph Willis		Labor	Keating	20 December 1991	27 December 1991	18 days
34	John Dawkins		Labor	Keating	27 December 1991	23 December 1993	1 year, 361 days
(33)	Ralph Willis		Labor	Keating	23 December 1993	11 March 1996	2 years, 79 days
35	Peter Costello		Liberal	Howard	11 March 1996	3 December 2007	11 years, 267 days
36	Wayne Swan		Labor	Rudd	3 December 2007	24 June 2010	5 years, 206 days
36	Wayne Swan		Labor	Gillard	24 June 2010	27 June 2013	5 years, 206 days
37	Chris Bowen		Labor	Rudd	27 June 2013	18 September 2013	83 days
38	Joe Hockey		Liberal	Abbott	18 September 2013	15 September 2015	2 years, 3 days
38	Joe Hockey		Liberal	Turnbull	15 September 2015	21 September 2015	2 years, 3 days
39	Scott Morrison		Liberal	Turnbull	21 September 2015	24 August 2018	2 years, 337 days
40	Josh Frydenberg^{2}		Liberal	Morrison	24 August 2018	23 May 2022	3 years, 272 days
(39)	Scott Morrison^{1} ^{2}		Liberal	Morrison	6 May 2021	23 May 2022	1 year, 17 days
41	Jim Chalmers		Labor	Albanese	23 May 2022	Incumbent	4 years, 153 days

^{1} Treasurers Watson, Fisher, Scullin, Lyons, Fadden, Menzies, Chifley, Whitlam, Hawke and Morrison were also Prime Minister during some or all of their period as Treasurer.
^{2} Morrison was appointed as Treasurer by the Governor-General on Morrison's advice in May 2021, with both Morrison and Frydenberg holding the position of Treasurer until May 2022. However, the appointment of Morrison was not made public until August 2022.

=== Living former treasurers ===
As of 23 October 2026, there are ten living former treasurers of Australia, the oldest being Ralph Willis (served 1991, 1993−1996, born 1938). The most recent treasurer to die was Bill Hayden (served 1975) on 21 October 2023. The most recently serving treasurer to die was John Kerin (served 1991) on 29 March 2023.

Treasurer	Term(s) as treasurer	Date of birth (and age)
Ralph Willis	1991, 1993–1996	14 April 1938 (age 88)
John Howard	1977–1983	26 July 1939 (age 87)
Paul Keating	1983–1991	18 January 1944 (age 82)
John Dawkins	1991–1993	2 March 1947 (age 79)
Wayne Swan	2007–2013	30 June 1954 (age 72)
Peter Costello	1996–2007	14 August 1957 (age 69)
Joe Hockey	2013–2015	2 August 1965 (age 61)
Scott Morrison	2015–2018, 2021–2022	13 May 1968 (age 58)
Josh Frydenberg	2018–2022	17 July 1971 (age 55)
Chris Bowen	2013	18 January 1973 (age 53)

== See also ==
- Assistant Treasurer of Australia
- Minister for Financial Services
- Minister for Consumer Affairs
- Assistant Minister to the Treasurer
