= Australian residential rental market =

The Australian residential property market is the section of the Australian property market that provides rental properties by landlords to tenants. In Australia 31% of households rent their residences. The vast majority rent from private landlords, and a small minority rent from public housing authorities. Over the last three decades the proportion of Australians in public housing has halved, whilst the amount renting privately has grown. The average weekly price for a rental in Australia is $570 AUD. Sydney has the most expensive capital city rents. Rental rates have increased faster than inflation in recent years.

In recent years, the cost of Australian rentals has become a prominent political issue; dubbed the 'rental crisis'. Demand remains high while supply is low. Some have advocated supply-side reforms to address the crisis, such as reforms to construction approvals, others for price controls, and others for demand-side reforms like immigration restrictions. The actions of Australia's major parties on the issue have been widely criticised as inadequate, though praised by some.

== Renting ==
Around one third of Australia's 9.8 million households pay rent for their residences. The other two thirds are owner-occupiers, half of whom have a mortgage. (Note: The most recent housing statistics available are from the 2021 ABS census, a survey conducted every five years.) Of the households that rent, ~83% rent from private landlords, while less than 10% rent from public housing authorities. (Note: The remainder rent from landlords that are neither private landlords, nor state or territory housing authorities; such as Commonwealth housing authorities like Defence housing) The proportion of households from a public housing authority has approximately halved since 1995, while the proportion renting from a private landlord has increased by over ~40%.

Immigrants overwhelmingly settle in Sydney and Melbourne, exacerbating the shortage of supply in those cities.

=== Rental prices ===
The average weekly price for a rental in Australia is $570 per week. Units are typically cheaper, at a national median of $540 vis-a-vis houses at $582. Rental prices grew nationally by 10.1% between 2022 and 2023; substantially higher than the annualised CPI rate of 7% for the period. Vacancy rates are historically quite low, at around 1%; a rate some argue is indicative of upward price pressure.

Median rents across Australian cities as of Q1 2023 is as follows:

Region	Median Rent (per week)	Gross yields (Note: Gross yields are calculated by dividing the annual weekly rent of a property by its purchase price. (i.e. [annual rent] / [property price] = [gross yield]). Net yields, which take into account aggregate financing, maintenance, tax, or other costs, are usually much lower)	Vacancy rates (Note: Vacancy rates are calculated by dividing the number of properties vacant for any reason by the total number of properties. Reasons for vacancy may include: disrepair, vacancy prior to sale or construction, renovations, etcetera)
Sydney	$699	3.22%	1.2%
Melbourne	$526	3.4%	0.7%
Brisbane	$599	4.34%	1.1%
Adelaide	$531	4.09%	0.3%
Perth	$572	4.85%	0.6%
Hobart	$563	4.39%	1.7%
Darwin	$588	6.39%	1.8%
Canberra	$674	4.19%	2.0%
National	$570	3.9%	1.2%

== See also ==
- 1999 Ralph Report
- Capital gains tax in Australia
- Negative gearing
- Home ownership in Australia
- Housing in Victoria
- NIMBY
- YIMBY
