= Housing affordability in Australia =

Economic theory

Chart 1: House Price Index and CPI. Source ABS

Housing affordability in Australia is the ability for people to access housing in Australia through its property market or residential rental market. Housing in Australia’s major cities is among the least affordable in the world. Obtaining suitable housing has become increasingly out of reach as property prices have grown much faster than wages from the 2000s.

Since the 1990s, house prices have risen much faster than incomes. In June 2014, Australia had the third highest house price-to-income ratio in the world. In 2023, Australia experienced 8 consecutive quarters of house price rises, and 7 quarters of apartment price rises. From 1996 to 2024, the level of social housing construction did not keep pace with sales and demolitions of existing social housing stock.

As of 2025, Sydney was the second most unaffordable housing market in the world, behind Hong Kong. By 2026, a solo purchaser earning the average Australian full-time wage would be unable to purchase a typical house in every Australian capital city. They would also be unable to purchase a median-priced apartment in Sydney, Brisbane, Adelaide or Perth.

Some claim high prices are due to regulatory approval processes.

Some commentators claim the phenomenon indicates a housing bubble. In 2010, the Government and RBA insisted Australia does not have a housing bubble. In June 2016, the Organisation for Economic Co-operation and Development (OECD) reported Australia's housing boom could end in 'dramatic and destabilising' real estate hard landing, and suggested that the Australian Prudential Regulation Authority (APRA) tightened bank lending standards.

== Causes ==
The Housing Affordability in Australia - Good house is hard to find report stated that "the average house price in the capital cities is now equivalent to over eight years of average earnings; up from three in the 1950s to the early 1980s. Some factors that may have contributed to the increase in property prices include:

- greater availability of credit due to financial deregulation.
- low interest rates since 2008, increasing borrowing capacity to borrow due to lower repayments.
- limited government release of new land (reducing supply).
- the average floor area of new houses has increased by up to 53.8% in the 18 years from 1984–85 to 2002–03.
- a tax system that favours investors and existing home owners, with policies such as negative gearing and capital gain tax discounts.
- government restrictions on the use of land preventing higher density land use.
- government restrictions on greenfield development designed to encourage "urban densification".
- high population growth (about double the world average in 2010- see Population growth rates chart).
- 2008 foreign investment rule changes for temporary visa holders.
- introduction by local councils of upfront infrastructure levies in the early 2000s.
- implementation of government schemes such as the first home buyers and first home builders schemes, which increase demand and therefore prices (supply and demand).

=== Influence of planning laws ===
Beginning in the 1980s, Australian states (who under the Constitution have control of environmental and land use issues) started progressively implementing more rigid planning laws that regulated the use of land. Planning laws often concentrated, after the 1990s, on restricting greenfield development in favour of "urban densification", or infill development. Land rationing is a system of banning development in all but designated areas, and can lead to extreme land price inflation if insufficient land is designated as allowed to be developed.

The restrictive planning laws in Australia have used land rationing systems as part of the goal of restricting greenfield development in favour of infill development, but this inevitably lead to land prices, and thus house prices, rising significantly. The initial thesis of YIMBY Melbourne was that local opposition to development was limiting the development of new housing, however planning restrictions were later considered to be significant.

Australian commentators often point to the experience of "The Auckland lesson", in which broad planning reform "abolished single-family zoning and allowed medium-density housing across" across most of the city, as a solution for Australian cities. Others claim the effect of planning restrictions is overstated; The Fifth Estate claimed that the "Auckland “miracle” has been roundly debunked by academics who say the data and analysis are deeply flawed."

Others have argued that planning laws do not affect housing supply, or that a housing supply shortage is not causing expensive housing. Academic Cameron Murray has argued that the idea that the shortage of housing supply due to town planning constraints is a "myth". His book The Great Housing Hijack, longlisted for the 2024 Australian Political Book of the Year award, claims that planning and zoning rules do not change how much new housing is built, only where they are built. This book has been critiqued by the Grattan Institute.

The Australian Council of Social Service wrote in 2025 "policies that focus exclusively on boosting housing supply, while needed, will not resolve the crisis on their own".

There is good evidence to suggest that the price of a new unit of housing is the ultimate anchor of all housing in an area, so when planning laws that implemented land rationing severely drove up the cost of new homes, all other homes followed suit.

==== Floor Space Ratio ====
A Floor Space Ratio (FSR) sets the maximum amount of floor space legally permitted in a new residential building.

New South Wales Treasury modelled the effects of allowing higher Floor Space ratios across most of urban Sydney. They found if the average permissible FSR from 0.7 to 1.5, housing costs would be 24% lower by 2066 than the base case (rent per square metre), along with the average household being 5km closer to the CBD (and having 22% lower commuting costs).

==== Heritage and opposition to development ====
Historically there has been significant opposition to medium and high rise housing development in Australia. The 2026 Ipsos Life in Sydney survey found 48% of people strongly or tended to support increased residential housing density in their neighbourhood. This figure was 46% in 2025 and 44% in 2024. 17% were strongly opposed and 18% were ambivalent.

Opposition to affordable housing tends to be higher in wealthy areas, especially where there is no previous apartment development. Objectors may claim to be expressing concerns about issues like parking or design, rather than opposing an entire project.

Opposition to development have framed their objections as a fight to "retain character" of a suburb. NIMBYs have exploited heritage loopholes to prevent development. Sophisticated objectors may feign compassion, claiming they oppose a development only because the proposal doesn’t meet the needs of the target population.

Groups such as Sydney YIMBY were started to advocate for greater housing supply.

==== Supply scepticism ====
A growing number of affordable housing advocates are questioning if increasing housing supply results in more affordable housing.

While 'supply skeptics' claim new housing supply does not slow growth in rents, economics research finds increased supply reduces rents in the region (and sometimes nearby areas), does not heighten displacement of lower income households, and frees up lower income housing.

The Australian Centre for Independent Studies claimed 'supply scepticism' is echoed in influential places and represents a large obstacle to zoning reform and housing affordability.

The view that new housing supply won't improve affordability, especially 'luxury' housing, is common in Australia, especially amongst urban planners and architects. The view that supply can improve housing affordability has been described by contrarian economists as a myth.

The Australian Housing and Urban Research Institute (AHURI) claimed there is no increase that filtering occurs (without including a reference) and that it is "incompatible" as a source of housing affordability. AHURI claimed housing supply doesn't improve housing affordability for lower income households, citing Been, Ellen et al. 2019, which stated the opposite finding. Critics of AHURI claim roughly half of their reports contain one or more errors affecting a headline result or policy recommendation.

The co-founder of Future Sydney compares filtering to trickle-down economics, and that where it occurs, is too slow to mitigate rental inflation.

=== Influence of tax system ===
Chart: % Population Growth. Australia - high growth rate strategy at 2.1% in 2010 - source Wikipedia & ABS.

The Reserve Bank of Australia has noted that there are "a number of areas in which the taxation treatment in Australia is more favourable to investors than is the case in other countries." The main tax incentives include tax deductions for losses on investment properties, even those that have been negatively geared, and the 50% discount on capital gains on sale of investments properties.

Investors using their superannuation for property investments have a tax advantage compared to 'savers' who are effectively taxed up to 45% (the top marginal taxation rate) on income from bank interest or bonds, as superannuation contributions are normally only taxed at around 15%.

The Australian government spends more on tax breaks for landlords than social housing, homelessness and rent assistance combined. Research by the Australian Council of Social Service (ACOSS) states that tax concessions for landlords cost $12.3bn in 2025.

In 2019, Deloitte Access Economics found tax reform (the 'ALP policy scenario' (Note: This 'ALP policy scenario' would involve "Limiting negative gearing to new housing" and "Reducing the Capital Gains Tax (CGT) discount from 50% to 25% for assets held longer than twelve months".)) would on average (across Australia) reduce existing property prices by 4.6% (or 8.3% specifically for Greater Sydney and Melbourne) and new property prices by 4.6%.

The Grattan Institute wrote in 2016 their "best estimate is that the changes we recommend might lead to property prices up to 2 per cent lower than otherwise". Such a tax change corresponds to a few months of housing price growth.

An OECD report in 2026 advocated for replacing state-based property stamp duties with a land tax.

In February 2026 the Australian Council of Social Service recommended to curb the 50% CGT discount by halving it to 25% over 5 years and ending negative gearing for new investments (over 5 years for existing investments). The organisation previously stated economic modelling suggests this would reduce home prices by 1-4% and increase the home ownership rate by 2-5%.

Tax settings in Australia that relate to the property market, and may support demand, include capital gains tax, negative gearing, the Aged Pension Asset Test exclusion of Principal Home, the First Home Super Scheme, and the HomeBuilder program at the federal level. At the state level are Stamp Duty Discounts such as the exemption for first home owners, or tax tax alternatives to stamp duty.

=== Influence of banking system ===
The influence of interest rates and banking policy on property prices has been noted. The financial deregulation has led to greater availability of credit and a variety of financial products and options. Presently the Reserve Bank of Australia has maintained for some time a low cash interest rate policy which has also reduced the cost of financing property purchase. In addition, the easy availability of interest-only loans has also made possible for property investors to borrow to purchase a property and compounding the benefits of negative gearing.

According to Amnesty International, housing has "increasingly been treated as a means to make money, rather than as a basic human right."

=== Housing costs excluded from the CPI ===
One of the market distortions in the housing market relates to the calculation of the Consumer Price Index [CPI], a key metric the RBA uses to make fiscal policy decisions such as setting interest rates. One senior economist noted "The index ignores price changes in the single biggest purchase a person (or household) is likely to make in their lifetime – a dwelling″. This implies that Australia's main official cost of living measure is failing to represent actual living costs, particularly for younger Australians who may incur substantial costs of purchasing a home.

=== Immigration ===
Levels of immigration are one component of increased demand for housing. Immigration and foreign property purchases are often cited as causes the housing crisis. Researchers state immigration is not a statistically significant contributor, or that other supply side issues such as lack of supply or demand issues like tax settings are more significant.

A 2004 Productivity Commission report stated immigration has contributed to demand growth, however was partly offset by resident population increases, and did not explain the surge in demand and prices from the mid-1990s to 2004. In a 2004 submission, the RBA stated growth in overseas students may have boosted demand for rental housing.

Between 2017 and 2024, there was no statistically significant correlation between international student numbers and rent costs in any major city.

A 2020 study estimated housing price growth between 2006 and 2016 would be 1.1% lower per annum if there was zero immigration, and stated high immigration rates are one of the reasons Australia has not experienced a recession since the early 1990s. KPMG estimated eliminating immigration for a decade would result in house prices growing by 2.3%, due to impacts on the construction industory workforce and wage inflation. Economists have stated reducing migration would marginally reduce the cost of housing while reducing long-term economic growth. Foreign homebuyers had little impact on the wider market.

Australia’s Race Discrimination Commissioner, Giridharan Sivaraman, has highlighted that housing stress, economic inequality, and job insecurity are pressing challenges affecting all Australians, including migrant communities, and warned against using migrants as scapegoats.

=== Foreign investment in residential property ===
In December 2008, the federal government introduced legislation relaxing rules for foreign buyers of Australian property. According to FIRB (Foreign Investment Review Board) data released in August 2009, foreign investment in Australian real estate had increased by more than 30% year to date. According to one real estate agent, "overseas investors buy them to land bank, not to rent them out. The houses just sit vacant because they are after capital growth."

In April 2010, the government announced amendments to policies to "ensure that foreign non-residents can only invest in Australian real estate if that investment adds to the housing stock, and that investments by temporary residents in established properties are only for their use whilst they live in Australia."

Under the rules, temporary residents and foreign students will be:

- Screened by the Foreign Investment Review Board to determine if they will be allowed to buy a property.
- Forced to sell property when they leave Australia.
- Punished if they do not sell by a government-ordered sale plus confiscation of any capital gain.
- Required to build on vacant land within two years of purchase to stop "land banking".

Failure to do this would also lead to a government-ordered sale.

Several Australian Banks and lenders provide home loans to non-residents for the purchase of Australian real estate. In 2021, a survey reported by The Guardian found that more than 80% of Australians believed Chinese investors were driving up house prices, despite a year of closed borders and record-low levels of foreign property investment. Lead author of the survey, Elena Collinson, suggested that sensationalist media coverage had contributed to this misconception, noting that the idea of Chinese investors as the main drivers of a difficult-to-enter housing market persisted even in the face of contrary evidence.

Data compiled by the National Australia Bank shows that foreign investors accounted for only 3.7% of new home sales and 2.2% of established homes in the March quarter of 2025, with the figures including all foreign buyers, indicating that Chinese investment is likely even lower. Eliza Owen, head of research for Australia at CoreLogic, noted that foreign investment has been trending downwards since 2014 and that the numbers are not significant enough to explain most of the recent housing price increases, which are instead driven by low interest rates, strong owner-occupier demand, and limited supply.

From April 2025, a 2 year temporary ban has been placed on foreign investment in established property, aimed to reduce competition in the property market. This will be reviewed in 2027 and potentially extended.

=== Lack of public housing ===
Social housing construction declined from approximately 5.2 per cent of dwellings in 1997 to 3.9 per cent in 2026. Maintaining the 2026 share of public housing would require social housing to be about 4.5% of completions.

An estimated $3.6 billion has been raised through the reforms to negative gearing, however this funding was not redirected to affordable housing.

== Definition of affordable housing ==
In Australia, the term "affordable housing" has a specific meaning. It typically refers to housing that is not public housing, and not housing that is guaranteed to be considered affordable for a given person, but is a discount by a set percentage (typically 20-30%) below market prices, sometimes for a limited amount of time (such as 15 years).

As of 2026, the term does not have a national definition. In September 2026, there was a political effort to create a national definition.

There are two main approaches to creating 'affordable housing', either a mandatory model of required homes as part of planning approval (mandatory inclusionary zoning, or an incentive model for allowing height or density bonuses.

Inclusionary zoning has been implemented in various states, especially in South Australia and New South Wales, with some policies in place in the Australian Capital Territory and Victoria. The City of Sydney has mandated affordable housing in specified zones through the City West Scheme.

Shelter NSW has opposed Transit Oriented Development proposals, if they do not meet the 15% affordable housing rate claimed to be part of a 'density deal'.

The bulk of existing academic evidence suggests that mandatory inclusive zoning (without density bonuses), substantially restricts new housing supply, making affordability worse.

== Government inquiries related to housing ==
In 2002, the government initiated a Productivity Commission Inquiry into the homes ownership in Australia. The commission's report entitled "First Home Ownership" observed inter alia that "general taxation arrangements [capital gains tax, negative gearing, capital works deductions and depreciation provisions] have lent impetus to the recent surge in investment in rental housing and consequent house price increases."

The government's response to the report stated that "There is no conclusive evidence that the tax system has had a significant impact on house prices."

In 2008, another study was commissioned – the 2008 Senate Select Committee on Housing Affordability in Australia. The report noted that "On some measures, housing affordability is at a record low.

"Australia's Future Tax System" (AFTS) review, more commonly known as the "Henry Tax Review", made a number of recommendations that would have impacted on the housing market, including:

- introduction of land tax "on all land ... removing disincentives for institutional investment in rental property",
- that "transfer taxes on property should be reduced, and ultimately removed",
- a move to "more neutral personal income tax treatment of private residential rental investment . . through a 40 per cent discount on all net residential rental income and losses, and capital gains."

In regard to recommendations of changes to tax policy that might impact the housing market, the Government advised "that it will not implement the following policies at any stage" (excerpt of list):

- include the family home in means tests (see Rec 88c),
- introduce land tax on the family home – this is a state tax and thus an issue for the states (see Rec 52 & 53),
- reduce the CGT discount, apply a discount to negative gearing deductions, or change grandfathering arrangements for CGT (see Rec 14 & 17c)

In May 2015, the House of Representatives Standing Committee on Economics started an Inquiry into Home Ownership. Almost two years later the announcement was made that the Inquiry had made no recommendations whatsoever.

In 2017, a Royal Commission into Misconduct in the Banking, Superannuation and Financial Services Industry was established. Hearings into banking misconduct began on 13 March.

== Effect of inflated housing prices on the greater economy ==
The housing crisis is often framed as a social issue, but it's also an economic concern.

=== Diverting capital away from the rest of the economy ===
Increased residential housing costs can cause excessive lending to the residential housing sector, at the expense of businesses. This can lead to "a banking system which allocated capital away from the most productive areas of the economy — business — is ultimately bad for growth, bad for competition, bad for jobs, bad for business and in the end, bad for Australia."

Research conducted in overseas markets confirms that "in areas with high housing appreciation, banks increase the amount of mortgage lending and decrease the amount of commercial lending as a fraction of their total assets. This allocation results in firms receiving reduced loan amounts, paying higher interest rates, and reducing investment."

=== Mortgage and rent stress ===
Increased housing prices and therefore increased borrowings can lead to difficulty in meeting housing payments. According to Ratings agency Standard & Poor's (S&P), "Arrears for sub-prime loans backing RMBS [residential mortgage-backed securities] jumped 126 basis points to 11.45 per cent"

== Timeline ==
=== 1980s–2009 ===
- 1985: Australian government quarantines interest expenses, so that interest can only be claimed against rental income, not other income.
- 1987: Negative gearing is reintroduced.
- 1998 : The ABS changed the CPI calculation from a cost of living "outlays" index which included mortgage servicing costs to pure price "acquisitions" index including the cost of a new dwelling (excluding land), thereby creating a disconnect between the cost of housing (asset) and the health of the economy (inflation)
- 1998 to 2008: real net national disposable incomes increase by 2.8% a year on average from about $32,000 to about $42,000 per year. There is a rise in the number of two-income households, relaxation of lending standards, active promotion of real estate as an investment, population growth creating demand that was not matched by supply, planning and land release issues and a tax system that was skewed in favour of property investors.
- 1999: Property sale proceeds subject to Capital Gains Tax reduced from 100 to 50 per cent (for property held at least one year), while 100 per cent of costs remained deductible.
- 2000: July - The Federal government introduces the First Home Owners Grant of $7,000 for established homes, and $14,000 for newly built homes.
- 2002: Urban Growth Boundary introduced for Melbourne, severely limiting land supply.
- 2002: While working for the Bank for International Settlements, Philip Lowe warned low rates could fuel risky credit growth and asset price rises that may need to be counteracted by tighter monetary policy.
- 2003: Significant amendments to Queensland's planning law, the Integrated Planning Act, are made by state government. These amendments aimed to better protect the environment by stopping "urban sprawl", and lead to massive land price inflation. Queensland's property prices start to rise quickly at this point.
- 2004: The Productivity Commission Inquiry on 'First Home Ownership' published its findings (No. 28, 31 March 2004). It identified several factors that had contributed to the rapid increase in real estate prices, including overall fairness of the tax system, lending regulations, lower interest rates and planning issues.
- 2008: A Senate Select Committee on Housing Affordability was established. Its final report 'A good house is hard to find' included dozens of recommendations.
- 2008: October - The First Home Owners Grant Boost is introduced as an addition to the First Home Owners Grant. This consisted of an extra $14000 available to first home owners buying or building a new home, as well as an extra $7000 made available for established homes. First Home Saver Accounts are also introduced, where the Federal Government will contribute up to $850 per annum towards savings for a deposit to purchase housing.
- 2008: December - FIRB rules allow temporary visa holders including students, to more easily buy up 'second-hand dwellings'. Changes did not require notification of sales be made to the FIRB and the $300,000 cap on price was removed.
- 2009: April - The Federal government announces Responsible Lending Obligations (RLOs) under the National Consumer Credit Protection Act 2009 (Cth)
- 2009: October - First Home Owners Grant Boost is withdrawn. The UNSW City Futures Research Centre director said "the boost has resulted in inflated prices" and had created "a bit of a mini-bubble". A senior economist of Housing Industry Association (HIA) said the boost has not pushed prices up significantly.
- 2009: November - "capital city house prices . . climbed average 10 per cent" in 2009. Melbourne led the "house price boom, with values up 14.9 per cent in the 10 months . . to an average of $481,247."
- 2009: December - Reporting of RE data was questioned by one source: "AVERAGE house prices have been overstated by up to 18 per cent by the real estate industry . . . In September the average house price quoted by the Real Estate Institute of Victoria was $67,000 higher than the official figure, based on preliminary valuer-general data . . "

=== 2010s ===
==== 2010 ====
- January - The removal of First Home Owners Grant Boost. Mortgage applications reduce by 21.2%. First-home buyers account for 13.1 per cent of new loan applications in December, whereas nine months previously they were at 28.1 per cent.
- March: ABS declares that house prices "soared 20 per cent in the 12 months to March" - a rate that was described as the "fastest ever recorded" in Australian history. The Head of Australian economics at National Australia Bank admits "This is a shocker".
- April - Rules allowing foreign investment in real estate that were introduced in 2008 are withdrawn. Temporary residents are required to sell their Australian property when they leave Australia.
- May - 'Australia's Future Tax System' (AFTS) Review (aka 'Henry Tax Review') makes a number of recommendations on policies that could affect the housing market.
- The government responds to the AFTS review findings with a report 'Stronger, Fairer, Simpler: A Tax Plan for our Future'.

==== 2011 ====
- February - New housing loans approved by Australian banks fall 5.6 per cent to a 10-year low in February.

==== 2012 ====
- October - The RBA cuts interest rates to 3.25%.
- December - The RBA cuts interest rates to 3.00%.

==== 2013 ====
- April - Glenn Stevens is re-appointed as RBA Governor for 3 more years.
- May - The RBA cuts interest rates to 2.75%.
- August - The RBA cuts interest rates to 2.50%.
- November - Statistics released by the Australian Prudential Regulation Authority revealed that the total amount of residential term loans to households held by all ADIs (authorised deposit taking institutions) was $1.15 trillion. This was an increase of 1.7% on 30 June 2013 and an increase of 7.5 in September 2012. Furthermore, investment loans accounted for 33.1 per cent of the loans. Major banks held $933 billion of these loans.

==== 2014 ====
- 1 January - RP Data reveals that national residential prices increased by 9.8% in 2013, with Sydney increasing by 15.2%.
- 13 January - Housing Finance statistics released by the Australian Bureau of Statistics shows the value of outstanding home loans financed by the ADIs was $1.27 trillion. $849 billion of that amount was for owner occupied housing and $419 billion was for investment housing loans.
- Data released by RP Data, APM, Residex and ABS in 2014 showed that Australian house prices continued to rise strongly throughout 2013 and 2014.

==== 2015 ====
- The International Monetary Fund sends an economic team to Australia to examine "the risks posed by property speculation and record-high household debt as part of a broad health check-up of the sagging domestic economy."
- The head of the Federal Treasury Department, and the Federal government's most senior economic adviser, John Fraser publicly warned that Sydney and more expensive parts of Melbourne were experiencing a bubble. This was disputed by members of the government including the Prime Minister and Assistant Treasurer.
- June - APRA 10% investment credit growth limit introduced.
- October - Macquarie Bank, a major Australian investment bank forecasted an end to property prices with "quarter-on-quarter house prices to fall from the March 2016 quarter before beginning to recover from June 2017, with a 7.5 per cent fall from peak to trough". Westpac Bank independently raised the rates on its standard variable mortgage by 20 basis points against the Australian Reserve Bank. This was the first rate rise by an Australian bank in five years.

==== 2016 ====
- 5 May - Philip Lowe appointed by Treasurer Scott Morrison as head of the RBA.
- May - From 1 July, "Foreign buyers will have to provide citizenship and visa details, as well as Foreign Investment Review Board clearance, through the stamp duty process." "The ATO will match data to ensure foreign buyers have paid a $5000 fee for any property sold for less than $1 million, and $10,000 for properties over $1 million." The investment review board is often criticised as being extremely biased as its criteria is loose and doesn’t use meta-data due to international restrictions. This increased rates of segregation and alienation of Australian home owners in the total property market nationwide.
- June - "In NSW, foreign buyers will be hit with a 4 per cent stamp duty surcharge from 21 June and 0.75 per cent land tax surcharge starting in 2017. Victoria will raise its existing 3 per cent stamp duty surcharge and 0.5 per cent land tax surcharge to 7 per cent and 1.5 per cent respectively on 1 July, while Queensland's 3 per cent stamp duty surcharge kicks in on 1 October."
- 3 August - The official cash rate drops to 1.5%, the lowest cash rate on record. The cash rate remains at 1.5% as of 1 July 2018.

==== 2017 ====
- March - APRA limits interest only lending to 30% of new loans.
- March - The four major banks, NAB, Westpac, ANZ and Commonwealth Bank increase home loan rates despite Reserve Bank rates citing the rising costs and regulatory responsibilities. These four banks controls more than 80 per cent of the $1.6 trillion mortgage market. Owner-occupier customers repaying principal and interest experiences the smallest rise while investors with interest-only loans get the largest hike. The changes effective in April–May.
- April - The Governor of the RBA Philip Lowe states that increasing debt and rising house prices were risking the future health of the Australian economy. He noted that slow wage growth was making it harder for people to pay down their debt and attacked banks for lending to people with too little income buffer after interest.
- July - Stamp duty abolished for first home buyers in Victoria, Queensland and Western Australia. Investor tax deductions for depreciation and travel abolished.
- September - The market reached its most recent peak in September 2017, according to Corelogic data.
- 14 December - Royal Commission into Misconduct in the Banking, Superannuation and Financial Services Industry established.

==== 2018 ====
- 13 March - hearings into the Royal Commission into Misconduct in the Banking, Superannuation and Financial Services Industry begin.
- 1 July - Since the previous peak in September 2017, the combined capital 5 city property market has declined by -1.3% according to Corelogic.
- 11 July - It is estimated by Digital Finance Analytics that there are approximately 1 million households in mortgage stress. These households risk defaulting on their mortgages in the event of interest rate rises of as little as 0.15%. APRA chairman Wayne Byres announced that the "heavy lifting on lending standards has largely been done", and that there was unlikely to be any further tightening of macroprudential policy.
- 16 July - Pressure is growing on the big four banks to follow smaller lenders (including ME, AMP, Suncorp, Bendigo Bank, Macquarie Bank, Bank of Queensland, ING, Pepper Group, IMB, Auswide and Teachers Mutual Bank) who have been raising interest rates on mortgage products from April 2018 onwards. This is due to a rise in the inter-bank Bank Bill Swap Rate (BBSW). It is speculated that the causes for BBSW changes include the US Federal reserve's increases in US rates and poor returns on Australian deposits drawing funds away to international markets and Australian equities for better returns, as well as income repatriation of large American companies following tax changes of Donald Trump. The funding gap between deposits and funds lent in Australia is estimated to have grown to A$457 billion in the first quarter of 2018. This is putting pressure on bank wholesale lending and profit margins, raising the likelihood of interest rate rises independently of the Reserve Bank of Australia by the big four banks, despite the ongoing Royal Commission.
- 7 December - "Uncharted territory", despite "the unemployment rate's been coming down, the economy's growing at a reasonable pace", RBA deputy Guy Debelle promotes further interest rate cuts and QE (quantitative easing) as methods to support housing prices.

==== 2019 ====
- January 2019 - RBA releases a research discussion paper 'A Model of the Australian Housing Market', which concludes that the lower interest rates explain much of the rapid growth in housing prices and construction over the past few years.
- 7 February - Home prices across Sydney and Melbourne continue to fall as the RBA keeps rates on hold at 1.5 per cent for a record 29th month.
- 3 March - Mathias Cormann described (downward) flexibility in the rate of wage growth as “a deliberate design feature of our economic architecture”, ensuring wage growth is subdued, requiring the RBA to maintain low interest rates.
- 12 May - The Federal government seeks to increase first home owners entering the market, through introduction of the First Home Loan Deposit Scheme
- 4 June - The RBA drops interest rates to a record low of 1.25 per cent, suggesting further cuts were to come later in the year
- 2 July - RBA drops rates to another low of 1 per cent.
- 5 July - APRA reduces interest rate buffer requirements for ADIs from 7% to 2.5% above the loan rate
- 1 October - The RBA announces interest rate cut to 0.75%

=== 2020s ===
==== 2020 ====
- 3 March - The RBA reduced the cash rate to 0.5% (from 0.75%)
- 19 March - The RBA introduces 4 core changes to support the economy as the COVID-19 pandemic shuts borders and businesses
  - Reduction in the cash rate to 0.25% (down from 0.5%)
  - Targeting the yield of the 3 year bond at 0.25%, through the commencement of bond buying
  - Establishment of the Term Funding Facility (TFF) to facilitate cheap credit to small business at rate of 0.25%
  - Increase in Exchange Settlement balances to 0.1% to decrease costs to the banking system for reserves held at the RBA
- 2 June - The Federal government announces the HomeBuilder grant of $25,000 to support the construction industry to 31 December 2020, with a budgeted cost of $680m
- April - Economists within the RBA propose pausing the real estate market to avoid a crash
- 26 August - RBA discussion paper shows that the banking sector could withstand an extreme but plausible 40% fall in Australian house prices.
- 25 September - The Federal government announces plans to remove Responsible Lending Obligations from the National Consumer Credit Protection Act 2009
- 3 November - The RBA introduces 3 core changes to support the economic recovery
  - Reduction in the cash rate to 0.1% (down from 0.25% set in April 2020)
  - Reduction of target of 3 year bond yield to 0.1%, with commencement of Quantitative Easing, by announcing the quantity of bond buying - $100 billion of government bonds over a six-month period.
  - Reduction in the interest rate on Exchange Settlement balances to 0.0%
- 30 November - The Federal government extends the HomeBuilder grants scheme until 31 March 2021 at a reduced rate of $15,000.

==== 2021 ====
- 1 February - The housing market started the year strongly with a national price increase of 0.9%.
- 1 March - The housing market saw euphoria through February with national prices rising 2.1% in the calendar month, fear of missing out (FOMO) leading to first home owners and owner occupiers making up the majority of buyers.
- 12 March - In a sign the interest rate cycle may have turned, rising global bond yields through 2021 caused the 30 year US mortgage rate to increase 0.4% (2.65% -> 3.05%) through January and February, despite central banks doubling down on low interest commitments to assure markets they will let inflation run rather than raise rates prematurely.
- 15 March - Term Funding Facility creates debt binge for banking sector
- 16 March - APRA release quarterly ADI statistics for December quarter 2020, showing "higher loan-to-valuation ratios and debt-to-income ratio"
  - Debt-to-income ≥ 6x increase by 26.3%
  - LVR ≥ 95 increase by 27.4%
- 19 March - Parents become 9th biggest lender in Australia, creating a financial system feedback loop ensuring that a downturn in housing affects not only first home owners and young families but also retirees, with large implications to pension and superannuation systems.
- 29 March - APRA chairman Wayne Byres states house prices not within remit of financial stability mandate.
- 29 March - The Term Funding Facility (TFF) is alleged to fuel a 2023 housing debt time bomb
- 30 March - Banks plan to avoid 2023 debt cliff by repaying TTF early and increasing saving rates
- 9 April - RBA flags booming property market as risk to the financial system
- 22 April - Mortgage rates in Australia begin the long path northwards
- 30 April - As the housing affordability crises worsens, the blame game ramps up, with Federal tax concessions, State planning laws, loose monetary policy and lax lending standards all contributing factors
- 30 Dec - Major Australian banks start predicting price drops for 2023.

== See also ==
- Australian property market
- Australian residential rental market
- Home ownership in Australia
- Housing affordability in anglophone countries
- Australian Dream
- Housing crisis
- NIMBY
- YIMBY
