= Australian property market =

Real estate market in Australia

The Australian property market comprises the trade of land and its permanent fixtures located within Australia. It is dominated by residential property and forms a central part of the national economy, with housing serving as the main store of household wealth and the construction and sale of dwellings accounting for a substantial share of economic activity and employment. The market is characterised by a concentration of population and value in the major capital cities, a housing stock weighted towards detached houses, and high levels of owner-occupation alongside a large private rental sector. Underlying demand for housing is shaped chiefly by population growth, which is rapid by international standards and driven largely by immigration, and by the average number of people living in each household. Supply responds more slowly, so prices and rents tend to adjust in the meantime.

Australian housing has drawn sustained attention for the long-run rise in prices relative to incomes, which has made affordability a recurring economic and political issue, and for one of the highest levels of household debt among advanced economies, most of it owed against housing. Real house prices changed little for much of the twentieth century before entering a sustained upward trend from the 1950s, rising particularly strongly from the mid-1990s after the financial deregulation of the 1980s opened mortgage lending to greater competition and treated housing increasingly as an investment asset. There has been a disagreement among researchers about the main causes of higher prices, variously emphasising interest rates, population growth and immigration, constraints on the supply of new housing, and tax settings favouring property investment, and about whether the market constitutes a housing bubble.

== History ==
The Australian property market has been studied over the long run mainly through historical house prices for Sydney and Melbourne, which reach back to 1880 and have been joined onto modern data to form a continuous record running to the present. In the seventy years from 1880 to the mid-1950s, real house prices changed little, with several periods of significant decline, before beginning a sustained upward trend. From the early 1970s real prices rose by an average of about 3 per cent a year, and the cycle that began in the mid-1990s produced rises of around 6 per cent a year. Across this period, the market moved through cycles tied to each of the major economic cycles, the two most pronounced being the boom of the 1880s with the 1890s depression that followed, and the boom that ran from the mid-1990s into the 2000s.

From the end of the Second World War to the mid-1970s, the market operated within a heavily regulated environment of low, controlled interest rates, with home finance channelled largely through building societies, alongside relatively cheap and abundant land. From the 1970s, and more sharply through the financial deregulation of the 1980s, this changed: the banking and mortgage system was opened to greater competition and to international capital, lending conditions were relaxed, and housing increasingly came to be treated as an investment asset as well as shelter, a shift often described as the financialisation of housing.

From 2000, prices entered a period of exceptional growth, with real median house prices in the capital cities roughly doubling between 2000 and 2010. Australia largely avoided the house-price falls seen elsewhere during the 2007 to 2008 global financial crisis. Growth was more uneven over the following decade: real prices fell and then flattened in the early 2010s, recovered to about 2017, and dipped again to 2020 amid tighter lending standards. Real prices then rose sharply from late 2020 through 2021 during the COVID-19 pandemic, before falling by about 11 per cent in 2023 as mortgage rates climbed steeply, and resuming mild growth from mid-2023. From the mid-2010s the market also became less uniform across the country, with Adelaide, Brisbane and Perth recording stronger growth while Melbourne lagged.

== Market structure ==
The structure of the Australian property market can be described by the make-up of the housing stock and by how that stock is held. Dwellings range from detached houses to higher-density townhouses and apartments, while occupants hold their housing either as owners, who may live in the dwelling or let it to tenants, or as renters.

=== Dwelling types ===
By 2025 Australia had around 11.4 million residential dwellings. Detached houses remained the most common dwelling type, comprising about 71 per cent of the stock in 2024, with semi-detached dwellings and townhouses making up around 13 per cent and apartments about 16 per cent. The apartment share has grown over time, from roughly 14 per cent of dwellings in 2010 to 16 per cent in 2021, continuing a longer-term trend in building approvals towards higher-density housing such as townhouses and units. Between 2015 and early 2025 the dwelling stock grew by about 17 per cent, marginally faster than the population, while average household size edged down from about 2.6 to 2.54 persons. Turnover in the market typically averages around 6 per cent of dwellings a year.

=== Ownership ===
Owner-occupation has been a defining feature of Australian housing since the mid-twentieth century. The home-ownership rate rose strongly in the postwar decades and has since remained high by international standards, holding broadly around two-thirds of households. That stable headline figure, however, masks a marked decline in ownership among younger households, for whom rising prices have made home purchase harder to attain. Owners of residential property fall into two groups: owner-occupiers, who live in the dwelling, and investors, who let properties to tenants.

Owner-occupiers have consistently formed the larger group, accounting for more than 60 per cent of total housing demand across the states and territories, though the investor share varies by region, ranging from around 22 per cent in Tasmania to about 38 per cent in New South Wales. Whether negative or positive gearing is more advantageous depends on prevailing tax settings and interest rates; negative gearing is most effective when interest rates are low and property values are rising, so that the expected capital gain outweighs the holding loss. Studies have found that investor activity rises as expected capital growth increases, with investors willing to accept lower rental yields, and that rising prices tend to draw in buyers seeking capital gains rather than rental return. Owner-occupier first-home buyers have increasingly depended on family financial support, sometimes called the "bank of mum and dad", to meet deposit requirements.

=== Residential rental market ===
Renting accounts for a substantial share of Australian housing, with roughly a quarter to a third of households renting their home. The proportion renting privately rose from about 20 per cent in 1999–2000 to 26 per cent in 2019–20, while the share renting from state and territory social housing authorities fell from around 6 per cent to about 3 per cent over the same period.

From 2022, advertised rents rose sharply, increasing by about 12 per cent over the year, the strongest rise in 14 years, while the national vacancy rate fell to around 1 per cent, a situation widely described as a rental crisis. Contributing factors cited at the time included some landlords selling to owner-occupiers, the use of dwellings for short-term letting such as Airbnb, a limited supply of social housing, and pandemic-related shifts such as smaller household sizes and movement to regional areas.

The severity of the crisis is contested. Analysis of official data distinguishes advertised rents, which cover only the small flow of newly listed properties and rose steeply, from the rents actually paid across the whole stock, which rose more modestly because most tenants remained on existing agreements; advertised rents have been around a third higher than rents paid market-wide. Measured against incomes, rents have broadly kept pace over the longer term, though affordability pressures fall most heavily on lower-income households, for whom rent can absorb 40 per cent or more of income, and are concentrated in outer suburban, coastal and remote areas rather than inner cities.

== Regional variations ==
The Australian property market is non-uniform, with high variation observed across the major cities and regional areas.

=== Sydney ===
Sydney is Australia's largest and most expensive capital city housing market. Its dwellings are spread across distinct submarkets that differ sharply in price and tenure: the northern and eastern regions are the most expensive and have higher rates of owner-occupation, while the more affordable western and inner-western regions have larger shares of rental and investor-owned housing. At the 2016 census around 29 per cent of Greater Sydney dwellings were investor-owned, with rented dwellings making up about 35 per cent of housing in Western Sydney compared with roughly 19 per cent in the east. By mid-2025 Sydney's median house price was the highest of any capital at around $1.46 million, having risen about 29 per cent in real terms over the preceding decade, while unit prices grew far more slowly.

=== Melbourne ===
Melbourne was historically Australia's second most expensive capital city by median dwelling value, but was overtaken by Brisbane, Adelaide and Perth during the mid-2020s. Melbourne's home values grew more slowly than those of other major capitals following the COVID-19 pandemic, with prices recording a small decline in 2024 before stabilising. By early 2026, Melbourne's median dwelling value was around $854,000 according to PropTrack, with values still below their March 2022 peak.

=== Brisbane ===
Brisbane experienced strong price growth through the early 2020s, with its median house price first surpassing $1 million in 2025. Cotality (formerly CoreLogic) recorded dwelling value growth of approximately 84 per cent between 2020 and 2026, making Brisbane the country's second most expensive capital after Sydney on a median dwelling basis.

=== Perth ===
Perth's property market underperformed the national average for much of the 2010s following the end of the mining boom, but recorded the strongest annual growth of any capital city between 2023 and 2025, with dwelling values rising more than 24 per cent in some twelve month periods. Strong demand has been attributed to interstate migration, resources sector activity, and the city's relative affordability compared with the east coast capitals.

=== Adelaide ===
Adelaide's property market recorded sustained price growth from 2020 onward, with dwelling values rising approximately 77 per cent over five years. The city's median house price exceeded Melbourne's during 2024, having previously been one of the most affordable capital cities. CoreLogic head of research Eliza Owen attributed the strength of the Adelaide market to low listing volumes and buyer demand from higher-income households.

=== Hobart ===
After being one of Australia's strongest performing capital city markets in the late 2010s, Hobart's growth slowed considerably during the Reserve Bank's interest rate rises of 2022 to 2024, with values remaining largely flat over the period. Hobart contained several of the country's most affordable capital city suburbs by 2025, with median house values under $450,000 in localities including Gagebrook, Herdsmans Cove and Bridgewater.

== Drivers and influences ==
=== Population and immigration ===
Population growth, much of it driven by immigration, adds to underlying demand for housing. The Productivity Commission's 2004 inquiry into first home ownership found that growth in immigration since the mid-1990s had been an important contributor to housing demand, particularly in Sydney and Melbourne, while noting the difficulty of quantifying the effect of short-stay migrants such as overseas students. Reserve Bank modelling of the mid-2000s immigration surge similarly estimated that the rise in population growth lowered rental vacancies and raised both rents and housing prices.

The extent to which immigration has driven more recent increases in prices and rents is contested. A peer-reviewed study covering 2006 to 2016 estimated that immigration raised housing prices by a meaningful but limited amount, accounting for roughly a fifth of price growth over the period, with larger effects on house prices than on units.

Several studies published in 2025 argued that immigration was not the primary cause of the affordability pressures of the 2020s, pointing instead to constraints on housing supply, tax settings favouring investors, and low interest rates. A study by the University of South Australia found no statistically significant link between international student numbers and rising rents over 2017 to 2024, and a 2025 Reserve Bank paper concluded that rapid growth in student numbers had not substantially raised rents or inflation. Modelling by KPMG suggested that sharply reducing migration could even raise house prices over time. In a scenario limiting population growth to natural increase, it estimated that a smaller labour force would push up wages and that the resulting shortage of construction workers would constrain new housing supply by more than lower population growth reduced demand, leaving house prices modestly higher over a decade than under continued migration.

=== Interest rates and monetary policy ===
Interest rates have large and clearly identified effects on Australian housing prices and construction, according to modelling published by the Reserve Bank of Australia, which also found that the effect of monetary policy on the wider economy operates largely through its effect on housing. The same research estimated that a sustained fall in real mortgage rates of one percentage point would, holding rents constant, raise housing prices by around 8 per cent after two years, with larger effects over the longer run. Of the roughly threefold rise in real dwelling prices since 1982, the modelling attributed the greater part to the long decline in real mortgage rates, which fell from a peak of about 6 per cent in the 1980s to around 3 per cent, rather than to growth in rents.

=== Land supply and planning ===
The responsiveness of housing supply to prices, and the role of land-use regulation, are debated. Reserve Bank modelling found that home building does increase when prices rise, estimating that each 1 per cent increase in the number of dwellings lowers housing costs by around 2.5 per cent. The same research concluded that planning and land-development rules slow new housing but do not hold it back completely, and that the rules tend to loosen when there is enough money to be made from building. Separate Reserve Bank research attributed a large part of the gap between house prices and construction costs to zoning, estimating that planning restrictions raised detached house prices in Sydney by around 73 per cent relative to the cost of supply, with smaller but still substantial effects in the other major cities, and that this effect had grown as restrictions bound more tightly against rising demand. Other research has questioned whether relaxing planning rules reliably increases supply: a study of Australia's largest listed developers found they held landbanks equivalent to many years of sales, including large quantities of already-approved land, and timed construction to market conditions rather than building out as quickly as planning permitted.

=== Household debt and lending standards ===
Australian households carry high levels of debt by international standards, most of it owed against housing. According to the prudential regulator, aggregate household debt rose from around 155 per cent of disposable income to about 180 per cent over the two decades to 2025, a level well above many comparable economies. The build-up has been linked to financial deregulation in the 1990s, which eased access to credit, and to the long decline in interest rates, which allowed larger loans to be serviced at a similar cost; housing debt makes up roughly three-quarters of the total.

Regulators have periodically tightened lending standards to contain these risks. The Australian Prudential Regulation Authority introduced limits on investor lending in 2014 and on interest-only lending in 2017, and from late 2014 required lenders to assess new mortgages against an interest-rate buffer to ensure borrowers could withstand higher rates. In October 2021, APRA raised the minimum buffer it expects to at least 3 percentage points above the loan product rate, and from February 2026 it limited lending at a debt-to-income ratio of six or more to 20 per cent of each bank's new owner-occupier and investor lending, with exemptions for owner-occupier bridging loans and loans for new dwellings. The Reserve Bank has assessed that, despite high debt levels, the household sector is generally resilient, with borrowing concentrated among higher-income households better able to service it; it estimated that even under a 30 per cent fall in housing prices, around nine in ten borrowers would retain positive equity, while noting that highly indebted and lower-income borrowers remain the most vulnerable.

== Affordability ==
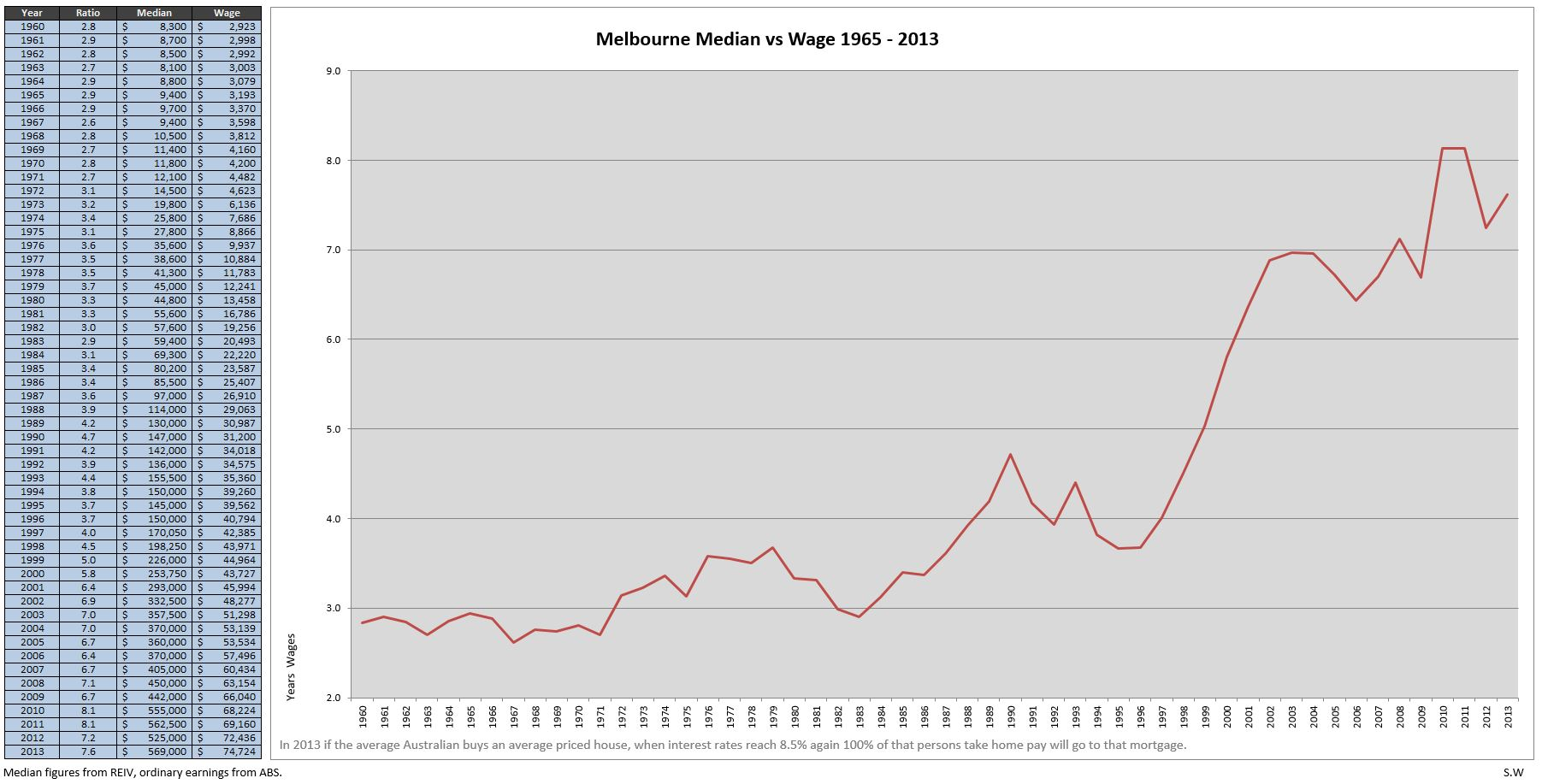
Melbourne House prices to income ratio, 1965 to 2013

In the late 2000s, housing prices in Australia, relative to average incomes, were among the highest in the world. As at 2011, house prices were on average six times average household income, compared to four times in 1990. This prompted speculation that the country was experiencing a real estate bubble, like many other countries.

A 2025 industry analysis estimated that Australia needs to build an average of 225,400 new dwellings annually to 2034 in order to meet both new and historic housing demand.

A Centre for International Economics report commissioned by the Housing Industry Association estimated that in the period 2023-2024, the total outlay required by a purchaser for a typical house and land package in a greenfield estate in capital cities of Australia to range from A$638,047 for Adelaide to A$1,252,365 for Canberra.

Cost breakdown of house and land package in capital cities of Australia in 2023-2024 (taxes included)
Category	Sydney	Melbourne	Brisbane	Perth	Adelaide	Hobart	Canberra
Raw land purchase All costs to the developer for purchasing land required for the greenfield development, including stamp duty.	A$308,924	A$163,048	A$149,726	A$67,045	A$80,010	A$97,055	A$399,758
Land sub-division and development All costs to the developer for developing the land ready for house construction to commence. Includes professional consultant fees, holding finance costs, contributed funds to future council-built amenities, infrastructure and civil engineering costs.	A$348,101	A$240,803	A$233,625	A$184,080	A$185,466	A$165,660	A$296,217
House construction All costs to the developer for building a typical single house on a lot.	A$499,023	A$439,018	A$445,618	A$392,582	A$358,872	A$416,643	A$542,858
Purchaser transactional costs All costs to the purchaser for transacting a house and land package, including stamp duty and conveyancing costs.	A$25,865	A$22,718	A$14,099	A$12,359	A$13,701	A$14,955	A$13,532
Total outlay to purchaser	A$1,181,914	A$865,585	A$843,066	A$656,065	A$638,047	A$694,313	A$1,252,365
Comparable median house price (June 2024)	A$1,428,000	A$914,000	A$936,000	A$762,000	A$810,000	A$717,000	A$973,000

== Foreign investment in residential property ==
In December 2008, the federal government introduced legislation relaxing rules for foreign buyers of Australian property. According to FIRB (Foreign Investment Review Board) data released in August 2009, foreign investment in Australian real estate had increased by more than 30% year to date. One agent said that "overseas investors buy them to land bank, not to rent them out. The houses just sit vacant because they are after capital growth."

In 2015, an opinion piece by journalist Michael West claimed that many Chinese buyers were investing in Australian property and suggested that some of the funds may have originated from illegitimate sources. He cited James Tee, an ethnic Chinese property developer, who argued that the outflow of capital from China was accelerating due to the Chinese government's anti-corruption campaign. West urged closer scrutiny of foreign investment and stronger enforcement of existing laws to ensure that illicit money was not being laundered through the Australian property market.

In 2021, the Guardian reported on a survey that found over 80% of Australians thought Chinese investors were driving up house prices. But CoreLogic's research shows foreign investment has been falling since 2014 and isn't big enough to explain recent price rises. Instead, low interest rates, strong buyer demand, and limited housing supply are the main drivers. The survey's lead author, Elena Collinson, said media coverage had made foreign investors an 'easy target," even though the evidence doesn't support it.

A 2025 poll, found that 69% of Australians polled supported a temporary 2 year ban on foreign investment in residential property, only 9% were opposed and 22% were unsure. A second question found that 47% supported a permanent ban, while 29% supported temporary ban and 23% were Undecided.

In April 2025 the ABC reported on Tasmanian House open-source housing project returning agency to owner-builders by providing clear, practical plans that enable people to construct their own homes without relying on expensive, inaccessible housing markets. These designs offer a pathway to self-sufficiency, affordability, and community resilience.

As of 2025, most foreign investors are restricted to buying new or off-the-plan properties, not existing homes. Critics argue that extra stamp duties and surcharges discourage this investment, draining capital from new developments and worsening shortages. The Housing Industry Association (HIA) stresses that foreign investment does not drive demand but instead funds the construction of new homes. HIA Chief Economist Tim Reardon explained: 'Foreign institutional capital does not create housing demand. It creates supply, and Australia cannot build 1.2 million new homes in five years while taxing the capital that is necessary to build those homes." He further warned that taxing this capital reduces the supply of homes being built just as migration continues to surge and create demand — calling it 'the worst own goal in the myriads of housing policy mistakes."

== Gearing ==
=== Negative gearing ===
Australian property investors often apply the practice of negative gearing. This occurs when the investor borrows money to fund the purchase of the property, and the income generated by the property is less than the cost of owning and managing the property including interest. The investor is expecting that capital gains will compensate for the shortfall. Negative gearing receives considerable media and political attention due to the perceived distortion it creates on residential property prices. In anticipation of Labor being elected in the 2019 federal election, the banks issued less interest only loans which are used by many investors for negative gearing.

In March 2025, The Australia Institute assorted that investor-focused tax policies have played a major role in driving up house prices in Australia. In particular, the 50% capital gains tax discount has encouraged speculation by reducing the tax on profits from property investment, contributing to a rise in demand and higher prices over the past two decades. The institute argues that these tax incentives, rather than foreign buyers or population growth, are a primary factor in declining housing affordability, and that reforms to capital gains taxation could help reduce speculative pressure on the housing market.

=== Positive gearing ===
A property is positively geared when its rental income exceeds the deductible costs of ownership, which include loan interest, council rates, insurance, body corporate fees and maintenance. The net profit is taxed at the owner's marginal rate. By contrast, owners of negatively geared properties can deduct their net rental loss against other assessable income such as salary or wages.

A study of investor activity in the Greater Sydney housing market from 1991 to 2018 found that the number of investors rose as rental yields fell, with investors accepting lower yields in expectation of capital growth and the tax benefits available through negative gearing. Positively geared properties are more common in regional centres and lower-priced outer suburbs, where rental yields are higher relative to purchase prices. Negative gearing is more concentrated in the inner suburbs of major capital cities, where prices have risen faster than rents.

== See also ==
- Housing affordability in Australia
- Home ownership in Australia
- Homelessness in Australia
- Public housing in Australia
  - Housing NSW
- Housing in Victoria
