= First-time home buyer grant =

A first-time home buyer grant (or first home owners grant) is a grant specifically for/targeted at those buying their first home – perhaps a starter home. Like other grants, the first-time buyer does not hold an obligation to repay the grant. In this respect, it differs from a loan and does not incur debt or interest. Grants can be given out by foundations and governments. Grants to individuals are typically a cash subsidy.

First time home buyer grants are typically awarded based on a few criteria, primarily financial need and income qualifications as well as never having owned a home before. However, in countries like Australia the criteria include maximum house price, that it is a new build or substantially renovated and having lived in Australia previously.

Many countries and states have initiated grant programs to help lower income residents with the purchase of their first home. The United States Department of Housing and Urban Development (HUD) also provides grants to first time home buyers. Such grant scheme are often modified or even closed based on changes in political leadership in countries or states.

Although intended to help first-time buyers into a home, some have argued that these grants simply distort the market and push prices up. An example in the Australian state of New South Wales where there is the house price cap for receiving the grant is AU$600,000, many houses are sold exactly at that level with bidders fighting for the price up to that point.

== Australia ==
A similar program called the First Home Owners Grant (FHOG) was introduced in Australia on 1 July 2000, where first time home buyers can receive a $7,000 once off payment to offset the cost of the GST. While the program is offered nationwide, the scheme is funded by the states and territories and subject to respective legislation.

=== First Home Owners Boost ===
In October 2008, the Australian Government announced a boost to the scheme to alleviate the 2008 financial crisis, in order to stimulate the housing industry and prop up the market. The stimulus consisted of $14000 available to first time purchasers buying or building a new home, and $7000 made available for those purchasing their first established home. The scheme continued from 14 October 2008 through to 30 September 2009.

Between 1 October 2009 and 31 December 2009 the grants were halved. Those purchasing or building new homes were eligible for $7000, while those purchasing established homes were eligible for a $3500 grant.

From 1 January 2010 onwards, the Commonwealth scheme ended. However, first home buyer assistance continued via the state funded First Home Owner Grant, worth $7,000 for both new and established properties.

Type	Scheme	Eligible dates	Benefit
Established homes	First Home Owner Grant	1 July 2000–present	$7,000
New homes / construction	First Home Owner Grant	1 July 2000–present	$7,000
Established homes	First Home Owners Boost	13 Oct 2008 – 30 Sept 2009	$7,000
New homes / construction	First Home Owners Boost	13 Oct 2008 – 30 Sept 2009	$14,000
Established homes	First Home Owners Boost	1 Oct 2009 – 31 Dec 2010	$7,000
New homes / construction	First Home Owners Boost	1 Oct 2009 – 31 Dec 2010	$7,000

=== Queensland ===
During the budget announcement for 2011 to 2012, the Queensland state government announced a further $10,000 QLD Building Boost for new homes, townhouses and units for contracts entered into from 1 August 2011 to 31 January 2012. The QLD Building Boost is eligible for first home buyers, owner occupiers and investors purchasing or building a new home. The total value of the new home must not exceed $600,000 to receive the grant. The aim by the Queensland government is to boost the construction industry that has seen lagging demand over the year.

The Queensland state government as of Tuesday 14 February 2018 decided to extend the Qld Building Boost for a further three months. The new end date for the Qld Building Boost is 30 April 2012.

The re-shaped First Home Owner Construction Grant kicked in on 12 September 2012 for properties valued up to $750,000 in Queensland.

The changes:$15,000 for first home buyers of new and off-the-plan properties applies from 12 September 2012 in Queensland. $7,000 grant for first home buyers of existing properties to be scrapped from 12 October 2012. New $15,000 grant applies to newly constructed homes, or properties bought off-the-plan.

To be eligible, first home buyers must:

- Make the property the principal place of residence in QLD within one year of taking ownership and live there for at least six months
- Not sell the property within a year of moving in.
- Buy or build at a property worth less than $750,000.

=== New South Wales ===
The New South Wales state government as part of its budget review for 2012 to 2013 increased the First Home Owners Grant in NSW to $15,000 but took away the stamp duty concession for established homes from first home buyers. The more than doubling of the First Home Owners Grant in New South Wales to $15,000 started from 1 July 2012 and will continue throughout 2013 with the First Home Owners Grant in NSW reducing to $10,000 in 2014. For non-first home buyers there is a grant of $5,000 available.

=== Western Australia ===
In 20204 the Western Australian state government started offering first home owner grants as a one-off for first home buyers in WA. The grant is $10,000 and would be paid to buy or build the first home in WA.

=== Eligibility ===
The eligibility criteria for a first home owners grant in Australia is as follows:

- The applicant must be buying their first home or building their first home
- Each applicant must be applying as a person and not a company or trust
- At least one of the applicants should be a Permanent Resident (New Zealand citizens get a PR automatically) or Australian citizen
- Each applicant must at least be 18 years old
- At least one of the applicants must use the property as their primary place of residence for 6 continuous months within 12 months of the settlement of the purchase or construction of the home
- All applicants and their spouses or partners should not have owned a residential property in Australia before 1 July 2000
- All applicants and their spouses or partners should not have owned a residential property in Australia after 1 July 2000, and occupied it for 6 continuous months
- Each applicant must have entered the purchase contract to buy the home or signed the construction contract after 1 July 2000
- The total value of the home is not more than the grant amount

Most first home builders will be able to assist in the first home grant application process.

== See also ==
- Home ownership in Australia
- Australian property bubble
