= Public housing in Australia =

Government supported housing in Australia

Dwellings rented from a State or Territory housing authority as a percentage of all dwellings in Australia divided geographically by statistical local area, at the 2011 census

Public housing in Australia is one part of social housing and the other is community housing. Public housing is provided by departments of federal governments. Australian public housing (often historically referred to as "Housing Commission") operates within the framework of the Commonwealth-State Housing Agreement, by which funding for public and community housing is provided by both federal and state governments. According to the 2006 census, Australia's public housing stock consisted of some 304,000 dwellings out of a total housing stock of more than 7.1 million dwellings, or 4.2% of all housing stock

Housing advocates have urged construction of new public housing dwellings to meet the rising numbers of families seeking public housing. Existing public housing stock has been severely underfunded, and older buildings demolished. There are also moves towards privatisation and transition into community and social housing models, reinforced through government policies which aim to sell large amounts of public homes into the private market. This has led to recent campaigns to save public housing marked for demolition, and advocate for upgrades and maintenance and construction of new public housing dwellings, such as the Bendigo street housing campaign in which homeless people were housed by community in homes left empty by the Victorian state government.

== Overview ==
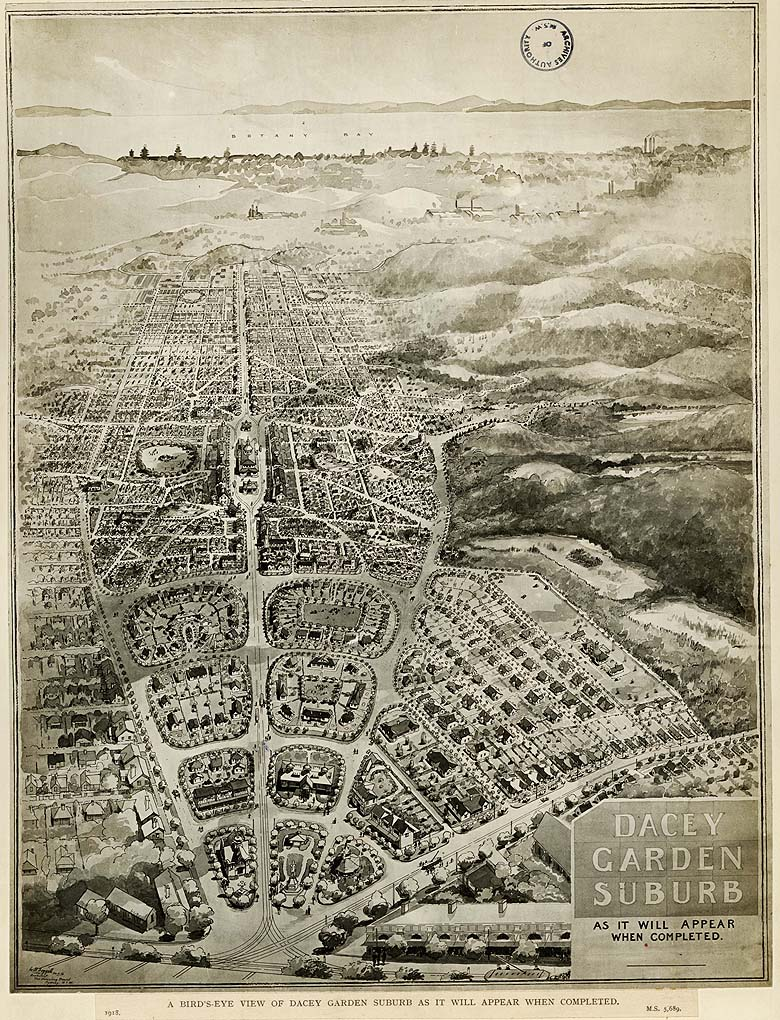
Daceyville, the first purpose-built public housing project in New South Wales

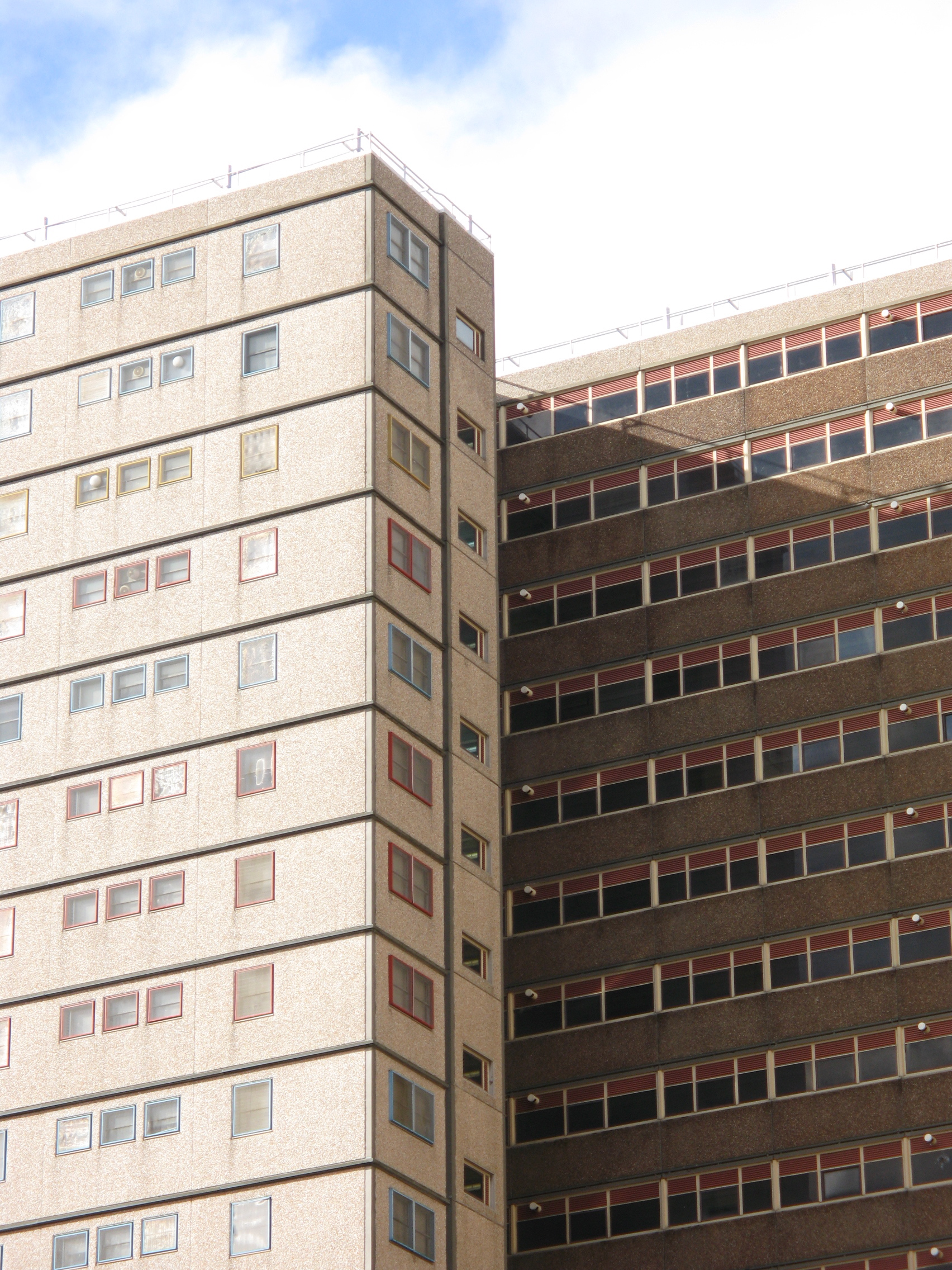
Public housing estate in Collingwood, Victoria

Housing Commission estate 'Greenway' North Sydney, 1953

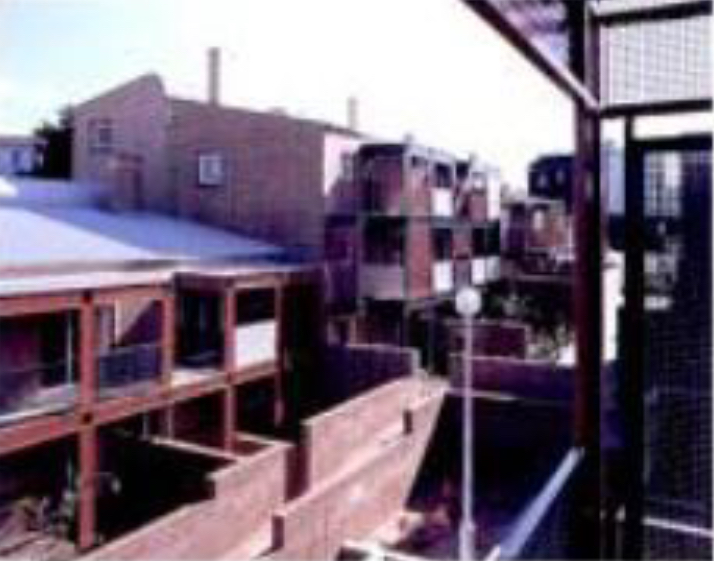
Golden Grove Public housing estate in Darlington, New South Wales

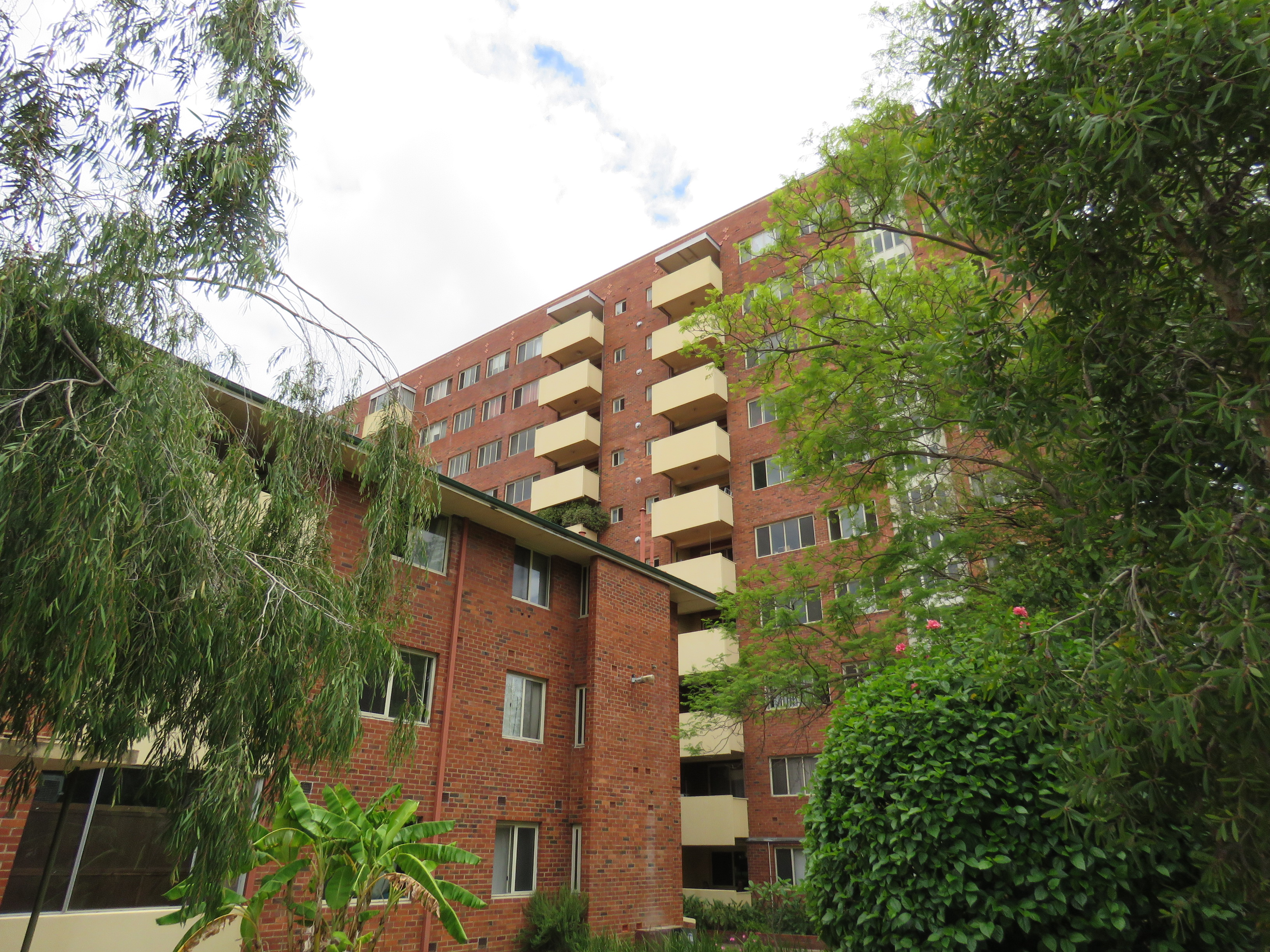
Wandana Public housing estate in Subiaco, Western Australia

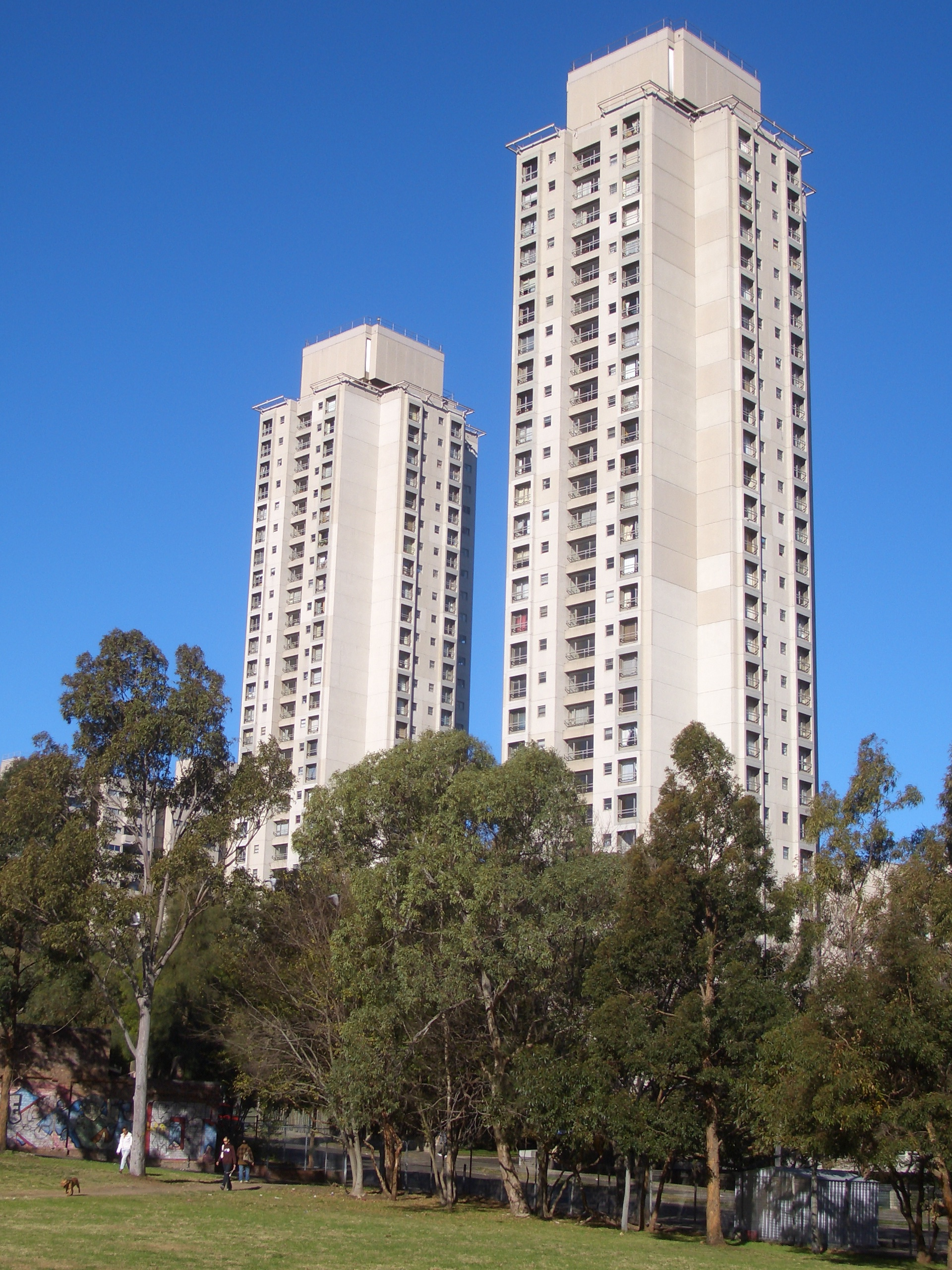
Public housing estate in Waterloo, New South Wales

The state government departments which are responsible for providing public housing have been known by a variety of names due to their history in each state, such as the Office of Housing (Victoria), the Department of Housing (Queensland) and Housing SA (formerly known as the Housing Trust, South Australia). Their official name tends to change with the way each state government prioritises public housing within its departmental structure. For example, for a time in the 1980s, Victoria's public housing had its own department (Department of Planning and Housing). Since the early 1990s, departmental restructuring under the Kennett government relegated its status to the "Office of Housing" within the Department of Planning and Development. It has since been moved from a "bricks and mortar" issue to one of health and welfare, now being an office within the Department of Human Services. The management of some public housing has been outsourced to not-for-profit management companies as part of a demand management philosophy to target it towards people with special needs.

=== Dwelling types ===
Australian public housing has traditionally been of two main types – inner-city medium to high-rise apartments, and low-density townhouses or fully detached houses on master-planned estates located on, what were at the time of construction, the suburban fringes of cities and towns. The inner-city public housing is mostly found in Melbourne, Sydney and to an extent, Perth, with a high-rise tower block development in Stainforth Court, Hobart. These estates generally comprise 3–5 story walk-up flats and 8–22 story high-rise towers. Since the late 1990s, the Victorian government has embarked on a process of redeveloping its inner-city estates with a mix of public and private housing. Low-density suburban estates can be found in nearly every city and town in Australia. Some of the low-density housing has been sold off over the years to long term tenants, and some has begun to circulate on the private property market at high prices in gentrified suburbs such as Port Melbourne.

== History ==
=== Public housing from the 1890s to 1970s ===
While many Australian housing affordability academics attribute the "Golden Age" of affordable housing in Australia from 1945 to 1975, issues of affordable housing and housing conditions in state capitals for workers had become a concern of governments from early in the 20th century. In the first decade of the 1900s, Australia was still feeling the effects of the 1890s economic depression. At the time, the only housing options available were private leasehold (accounting for 45% of tenure arrangements in Australia in 1911), owner-occupier freehold (accounting for 50% of tenure arrangements), and other informal tenure arrangements. Before economic recovery was achieved, however, all progress was halted by World War I from 1914 to 1918.

From 1912 to 1918, several state governments commissioned reports investigating their state’s housing system failures, resulting in the establishment of various financial schemes across all states that focused on making home ownership more attainable for more of the working class. In addition, the Commonwealth government established the War Service Homes Scheme in 1919 which offered very competitive loans to returned war servicemen for the purpose of constructing or buying a home. Although the 1920s saw a rebound in terms of economic and housing activity, the Great Depression of the 1930s saw economic and housing conditions returned to that of the worst days of the 1890s.

During the Great Depression, unemployment in Australia rose to over 30%. In addition to the rising level of poverty, the lack of new housing stock in Australia left an unprecedented number of workers left powerless in the face of merciless private landlords who at the time had the legal right to take as ransom the belongings of renters to cover unpaid rent and rapidly deteriorating living conditions. This resulted in a significant amount of urban renters turning to informal settlements and "slums" for shelter, such as Melbourne's Dudley Flats. The state of the housing system nationwide and the squalor in which those who were subject to it lived drew protests from the working class and the criticism of reformists from various backgrounds.

The Australian Labour Movement laid the blame for the poor social conditions of the 1930s in the capital cities squarely at the feet of the private landlords as well as the state and Commonwealth banks, which were popularly understood to also have played a critical role in the 1890s economic crash. Resistance to evictions during the 1930s, which involved tactics ranging from demonstrations to the occupation of real estate offices and homes, led to the introduction of government rental assistance in some states and fuelled demands for public housing. From the political right, there was slowly amounting pressure to reclaim the slum sites (often formed in seaside areas in Australian capital cities) for more economically productive activities. At the same time, proponents of the emerging town planning movement in Australia began actively arguing for state and national government involvement in developing town plans as a means of slum eradication. Inspired by the garden city movement in the United Kingdom, it was thought that the rationalization of urban development via town planning could not only improve the urban environment, but also social behavior. In the case of Victoria, Methodist social reformer Frederick Oswald Barnett during this period was particularly influential in creating wider popular concern (as well as voyeuristic interest) in the awful condition of the slums in Melbourne.

Another round of reports was commissioned by federal and state governments in the mid to late 1930s, including those of the Housing Investigation and Slum Abolition Board (Victoria, 1936), the Housing Slums Investigations Committee (NSW, 1936), and the Building Act Inquiry Committee (South Australia, 1937). These reports uniformly pointed to the proven inability of finance schemes directed towards home ownership to improve the housing system for the working class. This in combination with growing social pressure for housing reform drove the Tasmanian Government to establish a housing division via the Agricultural Bank in 1935, as well as prompted the creation of the 1937 South Australian Housing Trust, the 1938 Victorian Housing Commission, and the 1942 NSW Housing Commission. And then World War II broke out.

Against the backdrop of World War II and a housing market that had been at near standstill for a decade, the Commonwealth Housing Commission was established in 1943. Arguing that “it has been apparent, for many years, that private enterprise, the world over has not adequately and hygienically been housing the low income group”, the Commission promoted housing as a right for all Australians that should be targeted to low-income workers on a user-pays basis. While most recommendations of the 1944 Commonwealth Housing Commission Report were ignored by the federal government, the 1945 Commonwealth State Housing Agreement (CSHA) allowed the states to establish and operate public housing as funded by the Commonwealth via cheap loans, as well as encouraged states to provide rental rebates for low-income workers. While all states operated their public housing schemes in varying ways and with different objectives (for New South Wales and Victoria in particular, a major focus was slum clearance and rehousing of the poverty stricken), preference for public housing was given to large families and recently returned servicemen.

Under the first CSHA which was in place from 1945 to 1956, public housing stock nationwide rose from next to zero to 96,292 dwellings. Getting construction under way took time however and a continuing shortfall meant that many people squatted disused housing during the mid to late 1940s while others lived in former military properties up until the late 1950s. During this period, Australia recovered from the economic effects of World War II and, like many other Western nations at the same time, enjoyed a period of uninterrupted economic development. As the economy strengthened, the private housing market once again became a significant supplier of new housing stock. In 1956, the Liberal-Country Coalition Prime Minister Robert Menzies renegotiated the 1945 CSHA, sounding the death knell to the golden age of public housing in Australia. Under the new CSHA, federal money was diverted away from public housing and rental assistance schemes, states were allowed to sell public housing via any means they saw fit, and private home ownership was encouraged once more. From 1956 onwards, roughly 90,000 public housing built under the CSHA were sold across Australia.

Further heralding the end of public housing was the emergence of economic rationalism in the 1960 and 1970s. Replacing the post-War Keynesian idea that government intervention in the housing markets was a necessary virtue, public opinion was swaying to the neoliberal idea that government intervention by the way of public housing was one of the causes of the problem. This idea was helped along by the 1975 Royal Commission into Poverty that claimed that “Of the total 183,000 housing authority tenants the total poor numbered only 51,000; 132,000 housing commission rented dwellings (72%) were occupied by people with incomes more than 120% of the poverty line”.

=== Community housing ===
In recent years, not-for-profit community housing providers have developed a more prominent role in providing affordable housing to eligible tenants. These community housing providers are usually registered charities and include not for profit housing associations and rental housing co-operatives. Organisations such as the Brisbane Housing Company, a not-for-profit corporation operated by the Queensland Government and the Brisbane City Council is an example of a housing association. Cooperation between state housing departments and community housing providers is increasing, as in Queensland where prospective tenants who are on the waiting list for public housing are now also on the waiting list for community housing.

=== Public housing today ===
As of 1996, public housing was 5.6% of all housing stock in Australia. Construction of new public housing dwellings is currently at its lowest rate for 40 years and existing public housing stock is severely underfunded. The average Sydney local government area (LGA) lost 30% of its public housing between 2006 and 2021. In real terms the average LGA lost 17.8% of its public housing dwellings. The public housing waiting list in Victoria, for example, was at 45,600 applications, representing 99,000 people, as of June 2020. This represents a dramatic increase in applications in recent years. There is a severe lack of new public housing dwellings.

There are also moves towards privatisation through transition into community housing models. This can create tension between non-government organisations working on housing and homelessness, with some vying for management or ownership of previously state-owned or managed public housing, while other organisations resist privatisation and advocate for the expansion of public housing as the preferred model to alleviate waiting lists and homelessness.

There have been a number of recent campaigns to save public housing marked for demolition, advocate for upgrades and maintenance and construction of new public housing dwellings. State governments will occasionally announce funding policies for upgrades and maintenance. The issue of empty state government-owned homes is increasing as every state has hundreds or thousands of empty homes that could be transferred to public housing registers. In Melbourne, Victoria, this issue led to the Bendigo street housing campaign in which homeless people were housed by community campaigns in homes left empty by the Victorian state government. A 2025 effort to map microclimates in Sydney found areas with high amounts of public housing were among the hottest in the Sydney, specifically Surry Hills, Waterloo, Redfern and Glebe.

== Suburbs with public housing ==
Some suburbs of Australian cities with a high concentration of public housing, with at least 15% of all occupied dwellings recorded as being rented from a state or territory housing authority include:

Dwellings rented from the NSW housing authority as a percentage of all dwellings in Sydney divided geographically by postal area, at the 2011 census

Adelaide

- Elizabeth (19.3%)
- Hackham West (28.1%)
- Munno Para (28.2%)
- Plympton Park (26.3%)

Brisbane

- Acacia Ridge (15.6%)
- Inala (31.0%)
- Riverview (30.1%)

Melbourne

- Broadmeadows (15.2%)
- Braybrook (24.4%)
- Heidelberg West (36%)
- Collingwood (28.9%)
- Fitzroy (19.6%)
- Flemington (31.2%)

Perth

- Bentley (16.3%)
- Karawara (18.5%)
- Mirrabooka (14.9%)
- Nollamara (?%)

Sydney

- Daceyville (69.0%)
- Airds (58.9%)
- Bidwill (58.7%)
- Claymore (54.5%)
- Miller (41.3%)
- Villawood (36.0%)
- Tregear (32.9%)
- Shalvey (31.3%)

== See also ==
- Housing Commission of Victoria
- Housing NSW
- Public housing in the Australian Capital Territory
- Bendigo street housing campaign
- Radburn design housing

=== Australian housing ===
- Australian residential rental market
- Housing affordability in Australia
- Homelessness in Australia
- Home ownership in Australia
- Housing in Victoria
