= 2016 Bendigo Street housing dispute =

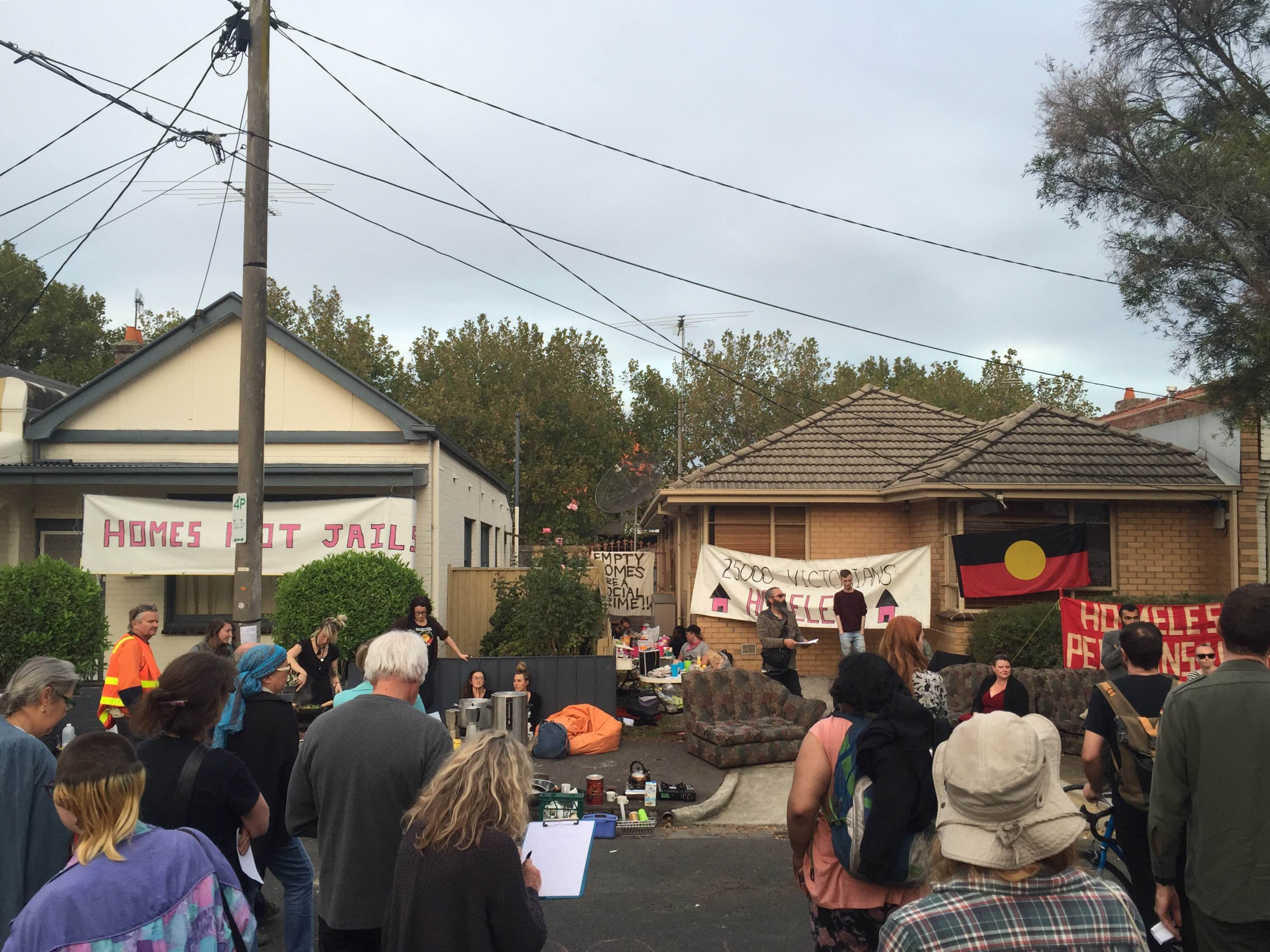
Number 2 and 4 Bendigo Street, Collingwood, on 31 March 2016 during a public community meeting

The 2016 Bendigo Street housing dispute concerned a series of occupations of houses in Collingwood, Melbourne, Australia. The properties were owned by the Victorian Government which had made aborted plans to construct the East West Link road. The houses, mostly on Bendigo Street, became the centre of a lengthy dispute between the government, Victoria Police and the Homeless Persons Union.

The occupations were described by the squatters as a protest about the lack of public housing stock in Victoria. Around 15 houses were squatted and the occupants fought eviction using an injunction granted at the Supreme Court of Victoria. The houses were finally evicted on 23 November 2016.

== Background ==
In July 2013, the Coalition state government under Premier Denis Napthine released detailed plans for its East West Link road project, a tunnel from the city end of the Eastern Freeway to the CityLink M2 tollway through inner Melbourne. The plans included compulsory acquisition of 92 houses and 26 businesses in the project area, which the government claimed to be the bare minimum required to complete the road. However, the acquisitions were criticised by the Labor opposition, which accused the government of failing to consult affected residents, and speculation about a possible class action against the government was reported in the news media. The tollway project was subsequently cancelled by the new Andrews Labor government, who initially committed to transferring 20 of the acquired houses to the social housing sector specifically to house homeless people. However, only four or five of these were filled – with people with personal links to the social housing organisation managing the properties – the rest remained empty 6–18 months later while the state government waited to rent or sell them on the private housing market.

== Houses occupied ==
In March 2016, a group of homeless women attempted to squat one of the empty houses in Collingwood but were quickly evicted by the state government. This sparked a protest at the house involving the Homeless Persons Union Victoria, homeless people, squatters and housing campaigners. After a day-long standoff with the state government over two of the houses, the community gained control of the houses and began using them as a campaign hub, a First Nations embassy and temporary housing for homeless people, demanding that all the properties compulsorily acquired be put on the public housing register.

Following the Royal Commission into Family Violence, the Andrews Labor government announced in April that it was considering using the empty properties as crisis accommodation for women and families escaping domestic violence. By August, there were around 100 squatters.

== Injunction and housing offers ==
On 11 August, the state government and police delivered eviction notices to each of the 13 houses occupied at that time, allowing people 24–48 hours to vacate, after which time police would be used to throw people back into homelessness. In response on 12 August, residents from the occupied houses filed an injunction in the Supreme Court of Victoria to stop the evictions. The injunction was granted on the grounds that 24–48 hours was not sufficient time to allow for people to vacate, risking forcing them back into homelessness. The implications for the women and children residing in the occupied houses are particularly taken into consideration. The use of police and private security in evictions was condemned and discouraged by the justice on 14 August.

The injunction and legal processes forced the state government to meet with residents of the houses; three families and three women were able to negotiate pathways into public housing, and to allow time to engage with services, while others were either not offered any housing, or were offered to participate in processes that hindered their access to housing. The keys to several previously occupied homes (such as 16, 12 and 2 Bendigo Street) were handed back to the state government and several residents are housed in public housing, some after waiting for years with 35,000 others on the public housing waiting list. The injunction was then extended.

== Eviction ==
Two weeks after the final expiration of the injunction, the police evicted 13 Bendigo Street on October 28 2016. Three Indigenous Australians were arrested. In early November, the body of a dead man was discovered in a house on the street. Following the death and reports of conflict between the squatters and other local residents, the state Minister for Housing Martin Foley said the situation was "beyond the pale".

All the squats were evicted by 23 November, when over 100 police swept the street, arresting three people. The Homeless Persons Union had already left the houses the previous week and a representative of the group commented "Nothing has changed, there are still no families in those houses they have taken back and they will probably be put up for private sale." On 12 November, the state government had announced a $109m homelessness funding package.

== See also ==
- Public housing in Australia
- Housing Commission of Victoria
