= Positive gearing =

Property investment term used in Australia and New Zealand

Positive gearing is a term used in Australia and New Zealand for an investment in which the income earned is greater than the costs of holding it. In property investment, this means rental income exceeds expenses, producing a net profit before tax. It is the opposite of negative gearing, where the costs of holding the asset exceed the income it produces.

The terms "positive gearing" and "negative gearing" do not appear in Australian tax law and the Australian Treasury describes them as informal terms for an investment's cash flow rather than legal categories. The distinction between the two as forms of investment is most prominent in Australia and New Zealand, where the tax treatment of investment losses has shaped investor strategy and been the source of public debate. In the United States and Canada, positive gearing is more commonly described as a "positive cash flow" investment. The significance of the positive-versus-negative gearing distinction depends on how a country treats rental losses: it matters most in countries that allow losses to be offset against other income, such as Canada, Germany, Japan, and Norway, and matters less in Finland, France, and the United States, which generally limit losses to future income from the same investment.

== Taxation ==
The net profit from a positively geared property is included in the owner's assessable income and taxed at the owner's marginal tax rate. Deductible expenses recognised by the Australian Taxation Office include loan interest, council rates, body corporate fees, insurance, land tax, property management fees, and the cost of repairs and maintenance. Capital works and improvements, such as the installation of a new kitchen, are not immediately deductible but may be depreciated over time. The tax framework that distinguishes positive from negative gearing in Australia dates from 1936, when rental losses were first allowed to be offset against other taxable income. This deduction was briefly suspended between 1985 and 1987.

New Zealand briefly phased out full interest deductibility for residential investment properties under 2021 amendments to the Income Tax Act, narrowing the gap between positive and negative gearing. The change was reversed and full deductibility restored from 2024.

== Investment practices ==
Investors may pursue positive gearing to generate regular income, support further borrowing, or reduce their financial risk if their personal income drops. A property's gearing position can change over time. Many investment properties begin as negatively geared and become positively geared as rents rise and loan balances are paid down, though the timeline varies by market and loan terms. Interest rate movements also affect a property's gearing position, with higher rates increasing holding costs and pushing more properties toward negative gearing.ref name="RBA2026">"Insights From New Data on Australian Housing Investors". Bulletin. Reserve Bank of Australia. May 2026.</ref> In Australian property investment literature, positive gearing has been presented as a distinct strategy focused on cash flow rather than capital growth.

According to the Australian Taxation Office, of approximately 2.26 million Australians with an interest in a rental property in the 2022-23 financial year, 1.12 million (49.4 per cent) reported a net rental loss; the remainder were either positively or neutrally geared.

A study of investor activity in the Greater Sydney market between 1991 and 2018 found that the number of property investors rose as rental yields fell, with investors accepting lower yields in expectation of capital growth and the tax benefits available through negative gearing. Positively geared properties are more common in regional centres and lower-priced outer suburbs, where rental yields are higher relative to purchase prices. Negative gearing is more concentrated in the inner suburbs of major capital cities, where prices have risen faster than rents.

Empirical analysis of Australian tax data has found that positively geared rental investments are typically held with little or no debt, while negative gearing is overwhelmingly associated with debt-financed investment. AHURI research has identified positively geared long-term hold investors as a distinct category of small-scale landlords who typically purchase cheaper properties in lower-value locations and aim to own their investments outright by retirement.

== Recent developments in Australia ==
In May 2026, the Australian federal government announced proposed changes restricting negative gearing to newly built properties and reducing the capital gains tax discount, with existing arrangements grandfathered for current investors. Treasury projected the changes would help around 75,000 properties transfer from investors to first home buyers over a decade, while government modelling suggested around 35,000 fewer dwellings would be built as investor demand weakened. The reforms were expected to increase the prevalence of positively geared property, since new investors would only be able to use negative gearing on newly built properties.

== See also ==
- Negative gearing in Australia
- Financial leverage
- Capital gains tax in Australia
- Real estate investing
- Australian property market
