= Home ownership in Australia =

Percentage of dwellings owned outright in Australia divided geographically by statistical local area, as of the 2011 census

Percentage of dwellings owned with a mortgage in Australia divided geographically by statistical local area, as of the 2011 census

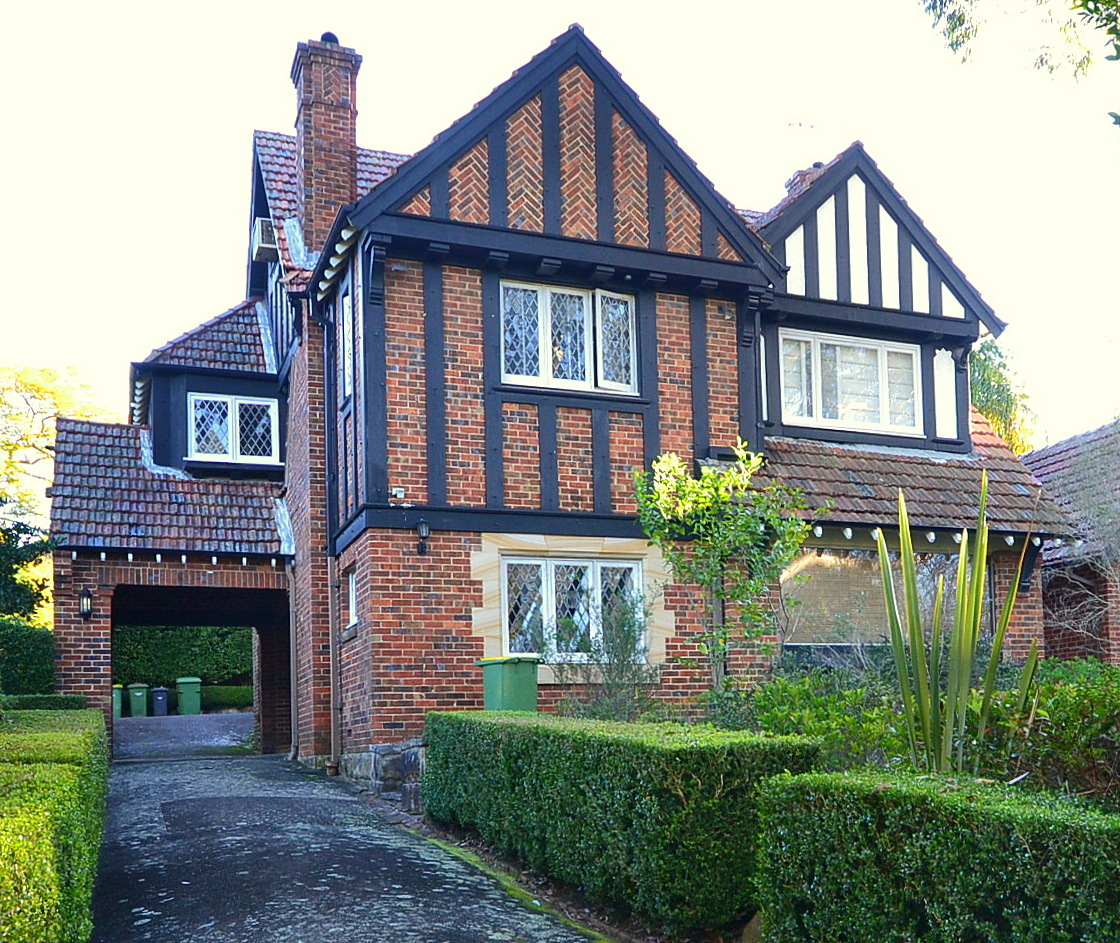
An Old English-style family home in suburban Sydney

Home ownership in Australia is considered a key cultural icon, and part of the Australian tradition known as the Great Australian Dream of "owning a detached house on a fenced block of land." Home ownership has been seen as creating a responsible citizenry; according to a former Premier of Victoria: "The home owner feels that he has a stake in the country, and that he has something worth working for, living for, fighting for."

By 2021, there were more than 10.8 million private dwellings in Australia, each with an average of 2.6 occupants, where 70% were separate houses, 13% were townhouses and 16% were apartments. Around 1 million of these dwellings were reported unoccupied. Two thirds of households owned their home outright or with a mortgage. The remainder were rented dwellings.

Owner-occupied housing in Australia is not treated as an investment asset. Mortgage interest is not tax deductible as, for example, in the United States. An owner-occupied residential home is not subject to the capital gains tax on sale and is not counted in the assets test for Centrelink pension purposes. It is also not taxed for land tax, although such taxes are traditionally determined at a state level.

In the past, home ownership has been described as equalising; in postwar Australia, immigrant Australians could often buy homes as quickly as native-born Australians. Additionally, Australian suburbs have been more socio-economically mixed than those in America and to a lesser extent Britain. In Melbourne, for instance, one early observer noted that "a poor house stands side by side with a good house."

There are significant regional differences in rates of homeownership around Australia, reflecting average age differences (e.g., older age people tend to own houses more than younger people), as well as socio-economic differences.

Initiatives such as the Tasmanian House open-source housing project have been looking for alternatives by seeking to return agency to owner-builders by providing clear, practical plans that enable people to construct their own homes without relying on expensive, inaccessible housing markets.

== Statistics ==
In the 2015–16 Survey of Income and Housing, it was found that an estimated 30% of households owned their homes outright (i.e. without a mortgage) and 37% were owners with a mortgage. A further 25% were renting from a private landlord and 4% were renting from a state or territory housing authority.

Between June 1995 and June 2015, the proportion of households without a mortgage declined from 42% to 31%, while the proportion with a mortgage rose from 30% to 36%. Since 1999-2000 the proportion of households renting from state/territory housing authorities has declined from 6% to 3% while the proportion renting privately increased from 20% to 26% in 2019-20. While a greater proportion of all renting households are renting from private landlords, there is an increased number of private renters receiving Commonwealth rent assistance.

Home ownership in Australia decreased to 67% in 2011, the lowest level in over 50 years. Tasmania has the highest home-ownership rate at 70%, and the Northern Territory the lowest at 46%.

As of the 2016 Census, home ownership in Australia had decreased to 65%.

== Property as an investment ==
The 25% of dwellings which are rented by private landlords may be considered income-producing or investment properties, and the private landlords as investors, though some owner-occupiers may also view their dwellings as investments. Private landlords generally collect rent from a tenant as taxable income, whilst an owner-occupier derives imputed rent from living in the dwelling, and is also not subject to capital gains tax. Similarly, the investor can claim expenses relating to the property, including property taxes, interest and depreciation, whilst the owner-occupier cannot. The rent paid by a tenant for private or domestic purposes is not generally an allowable deduction of the tenant, nor are any expenses relating to the property.

A property investor can utilise calculations such as the Land-to-Asset Ratio. The land-to-asset ratio is a real estate valuation measure that compares the value of the land on which a property stands to the total value of the property - including the land, buildings, and any improvements. This ratio is particularly useful to property investors and agents as it helps determine the intrinsic value a piece of land holds in a property, thereby influencing its potential for appreciation and impact on returns.

The formula for calculating the land-to-asset ratio is very straightforward: Land-to-Asset Ratio = (Value of Land / Total Value of Property) * 100%

== Affordability ==
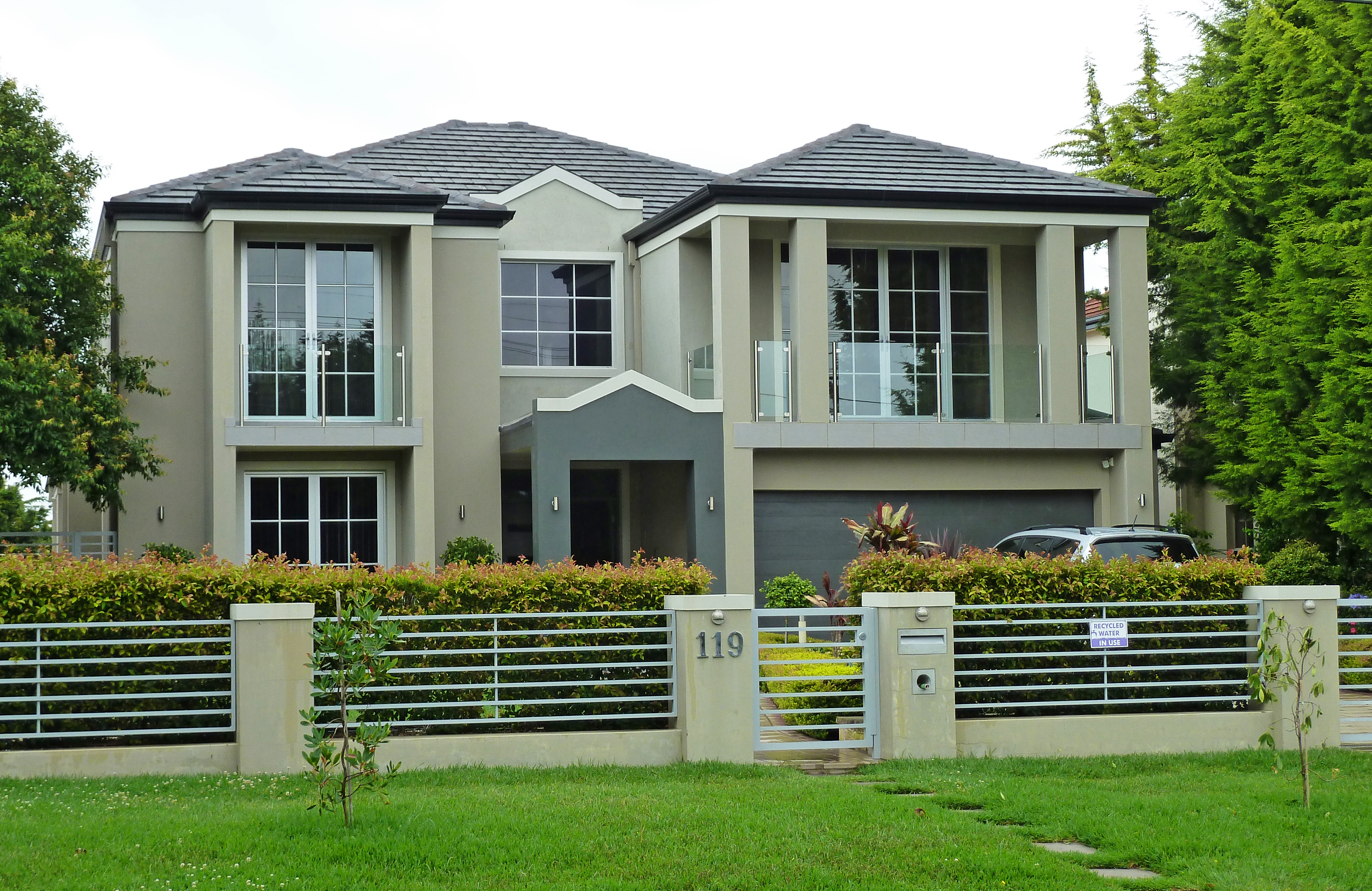
A modern single family Australian home in East Killara, New South Wales

Rising house prices, stagnant wage growth, and increasing interest rates have all contributed to a decline in housing affordability in Australia.

The median dwelling value to income ratio has increased to 8x, almost 20% above the average of the past two decades. With an annual savings rate of 15% per annum, it takes the average Australian household over a decade to save a 20% deposit for an average dwelling, placing Australia among the most expensive housing markets globally.

== Characteristics ==
New homes have increased in size and hold fewer people on average than in the past. The proportion of houses with four or more bedrooms increased from 15% in 1971 to greater than 30% in 2001.

=== Immigration to Australia ===
==== 2000s ====
In 2006 and 2007, a Macquarie Bank analyst Rory Robertson reportedly argued that high immigration, low interest rates, capital gains tax discounts, subsidies to boost fertility, and Australians clustering in capital cities were all main factors that contributed to rising housing unaffordability, with federal policies fueling demand having a greater impact than land release on urban fringes.

The Productivity Commission Inquiry Report No. 28 First Home Ownership (2004) also stated, in relation to housing, "that Growth in immigration since the mid-1990s has been an important contributor to underlying demand, particularly in Sydney and Melbourne." This has been exacerbated by Australian lenders relaxing credit guidelines for temporary residents, allowing them to buy a home with a 10 percent deposit.

The RBA in its submission to the same PC Report also stated "rapid growth in overseas visitors such as students may have boosted demand for rental housing". However, in question in the report was the statistical coverage of resident population. The "ABS population growth figures omit certain household formation groups – namely, overseas students and business migrants who do not continuously stay for 12 months in Australia." This statistical omission lead to the admission: "The Commission recognises that the ABS resident population estimates have limitations when used for assessing housing demand. Given the significant influx of foreigners coming to work or study in Australia in recent years, it seems highly likely that short-stay visitor movements may have added to the demand for housing. However, the Commissions are unaware of any research that quantifies the effects."

Some individuals and interest groups have also argued that immigration causes overburdened infrastructure.

==== 2020s ====
In the 2020s, several studies and analyses indicated that immigration and foreign property purchases were not the main drivers of Australia’s housing affordability issues. A 2025 BBC article reported that migration was “not a statistically significant contributor,” with analysts instead identifying limited housing supply, tax incentives for investors, and broader demand-side pressures as the primary drivers.

A University of South Australia study published in March 2025 analyzed rental data from 2017 to 2024 and found no statistically significant correlation between international student numbers and rising rents. Lead researcher Professor Michael Mu noted that international students were often identified as a convenient scapegoat for the rental crisis. Similarly, a July 2025 Reserve Bank of Australia report concluded that the post-pandemic growth in international student numbers had a limited impact on rents and inflation. Research by The Australia Institute in April 2025 found that house prices increased even during periods of low migration. The report identified limited construction of affordable housing and a market favoring investors as key factors contributing to unaffordability.

A September 2025 Guardian article reported on modelling by KPMG Chief Economist Brendan Rynne, which suggested that reducing migration to natural population growth alone could lead to higher house prices. According to the model, a smaller labour force would constrain construction, while higher wages would contribute to inflation, offsetting some of the benefits of slower population growth. Overall, the analysis indicates that migration restrictions could paradoxically increase housing costs over a decade compared with ongoing migration.

=== Foreign investment in residential property ===
In December 2008, the federal government introduced legislation relaxing rules for foreign buyers of Australian property. According to FIRB (Foreign Investment Review Board) data released in August 2009, foreign investment in Australian real estate had increased by more than 30% year to date. One agent said that "overseas investors buy them to land bank, not to rent them out. The houses just sit vacant because they are after capital growth."

A 2025 poll, found that 69% of Australians polled supported a temporary 2 year ban on foreign investment in residential property, only 9% were opposed and 22% were unsure. A second question found that 47% supported a permanent ban, while 29% supported temporary ban and 23% were Undecided.

According to YIMBY Melbourne, foreign ownership is not a major driver of Australia’s housing crisis. At most, 2% of total housing stock is foreign-owned, with only 0.75% of total sales in 2021 going to foreign buyers. Many foreign purchases do not directly increase housing demand for example, when a parent buys a home for a child studying in Australia or when purchased properties are leased, adding to rental supply.

Australia has some of the world’s strictest restrictions on foreign property ownership, including limits on buying existing homes, requirements for FIRB approval and fees for new properties, and additional state and federal taxes and surcharges on foreign investors. A 2016 Treasury Working Paper found that foreign investment contributed only 0.5–1% to property price growth in Melbourne and Sydney between 2010 and 2015. YIMBY Melbourne concludes that, given these restrictions and the small role foreign buyers play, new policies targeting foreign investment are unlikely to significantly improve housing affordability.

=== Inner-city apartment boom ===
To cope with the high demand of housing, the desirability in renting, and most significantly an influx of immigration, major Australian cities have seen a boom in high-rise apartment construction. According to ABC News and UBS, the number of cranes on Australian high-rise sites levelled out at a peak of 548 in 2017, having surged 323% since late-2013.

== See also ==
- Australian property market
- Housing affordability in Australia
- Poverty in Australia
- Homelessness in Australia
- Public housing in Australia
- Housing in Victoria
- Renters and Housing Union
- Minister for Housing (Australia)
- Minister for Housing (Victoria)
- Minister for Housing (New South Wales)
- Minister for Housing (Western Australia)
