= Renters and Housing Union =

Tenants union organised in Australia

- Founded: May 2020; 6 years ago
- Headquarters: Carlton, Victoria
- Location: Australia
- Members: 1,937 (December, 2024)
- Website: rahu.org.au

The Renters and Housing Union (RAHU) is a syndicalist tenants union based in Australia. RAHU organises for safe and secure housing through self-advocacy, education, and eviction defence. This includes supporting tenants through processes like evictions and bond recovery, with the union recouping $12,000 in members' bond money in a year. The Secretary of RAHU is Adu Hani.

== History ==
The Renters and Housing Union was established in May 2020 as a response to increased housing precarity due to the COVID-19 pandemic. The union was formed following a rent strike campaign organised by the Industrial Workers of the World branch in Melbourne.

During the COVID-19 pandemic in Victoria, RAHU campaigned for an eviction moratorium that was instated in Victoria for a period of time. During the eviction moratorium, temporarily housed homeless people were evicted from hotel accommodation. This was opposed by RAHU.

In the union's first year, members dealt with a total of 84 cases involving 146 claims. Of those cases, $126,775.20 of $139,947.16 in debt was resolved in favour of RAHU members by negotiating rent reductions, debt waivers, preventing rental increases, or claiming bonds.

In 2024 a Western Australia Branch of RAHU was founded and as of 2025 a statewide New South Wales Branch also exists.

In 2026 RAHU led the first organised residential eviction resistance in Western Australia, preventing the eviction of a single mother.

== Positions and Objectives ==
RAHU describes itself as Syndicalist within its constitution.

RAHU's demands include: a 2 year rent freeze, taxation of empty properties and national level minimum standards for rentals. It also has a set various objectives which includes the long term objective of the "Abolition of rent."

During the COVID-19 pandemic, RAHU campaigned for increased rental protections including an eviction moratorium. RAHU advocates for expanding public housing as opposed to social housing.

In November of 2025 RAHU released a position paper called "Universal Rent Control via Collective Bargaining" arguing for a system of rent control, with rent to be determined via negotiations between organised groups of tenants and landlords.

== Membership ==
RAHU membership includes renters, homeowners and people in insecure housing. Homeowners cannot vote. Landlords, real estate agents, property managers, police officers, bailiffs, and sheriffs are not allowed to join the union.

As of December 2024 RAHU has 1,937 Active members

=== Notable Members ===
Political activist Jordan van den Lamb is a member and collaborates with the Renters and Housing Union.

Founder of the Black Peoples Union Keiran Stewart-Assheton is a member and was previously the unions First Nations Officer.
