= Australian property legislation =

Australian property legislation refers to the different schemes of regulating property rights between each jurisdiction of the states and territories in Australia; combining legislation and receptive of common law. Despite differing statutes, the substantive effect in each jurisdiction is quite similar. The reason there is no unified national system for regulating property is the reservation of this power to the states in the constitution. There have been discussions about a co-operative system of regulation to be implemented between the states, conferring jurisdiction on the federal commonwealth in a similar manner done in the Corporations Act 2001.

Property legislation in all states is grounded upon the Torrens principle of registration of title. This posits that each state has a central register of all land in the state and that the register also shows the 'owner' of the land. This system was devised to reduce the amount of fraud relating to land due to the falsification of title deeds. The system also provides for registration of other entitlements to land such as a mortgage, by which land is used to secure a loan. Another major principle of this system is 'indefeasibility' of the title – where a right has been entered on the register, it cannot be defeated by later rights except in certain circumstances.

== List of legislation by state or territory ==
- Real Property Act 1900 (NSW); see also Conveyancing Act 1919 (NSW) AustLii
- Transfer of Land Act 1958 (VIC)
- Land Titles Act 1925 (ACT)
- Property Law Act 2023 (QLD)
- Law of Property Act (NT)
- Real Property Act 1886 (SA)
- Land Titles Act 1980 (TAS)
- Property Law Act 1969 (WA)
