= Housing in Victoria, Australia =

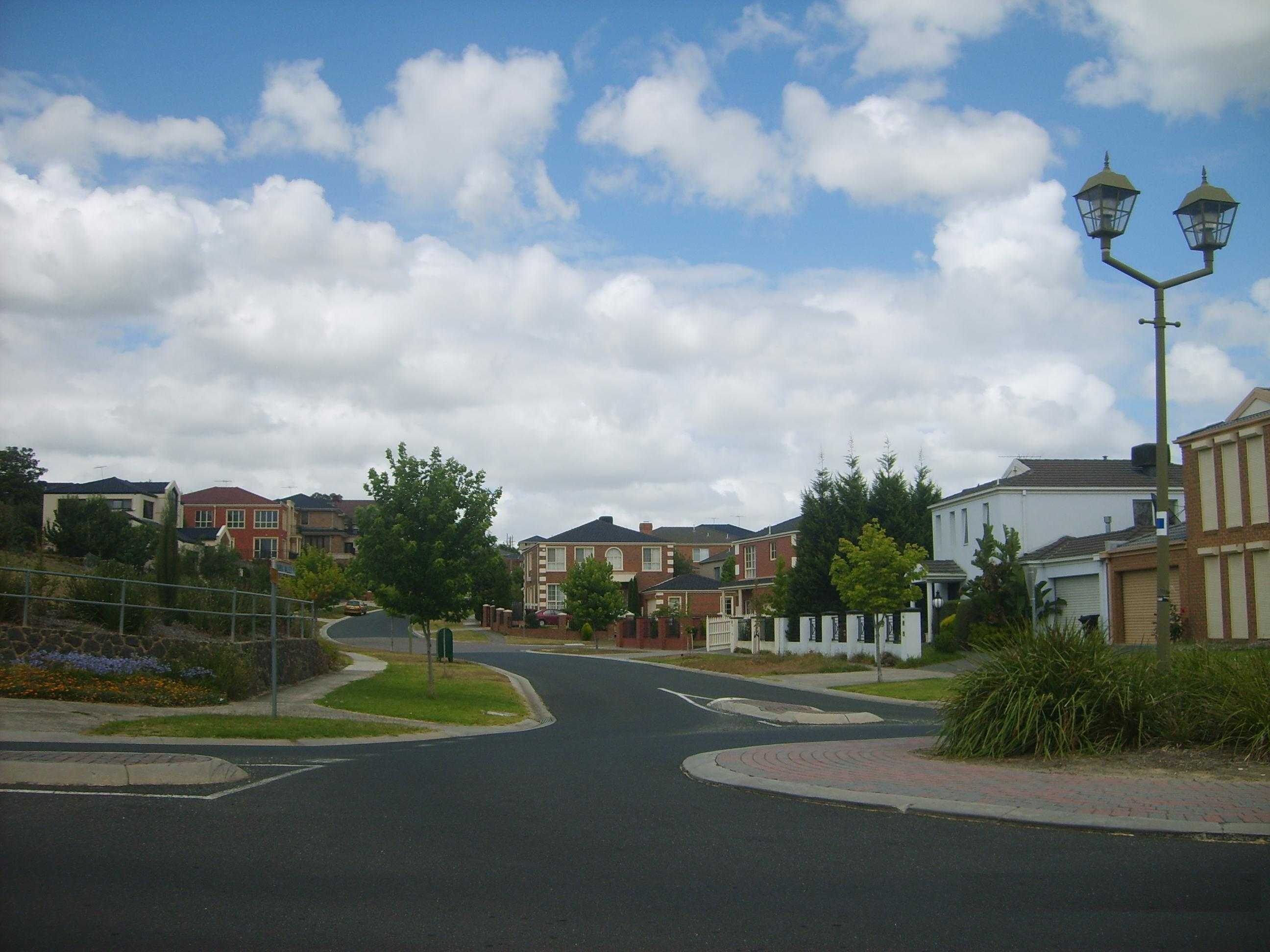
Housing typical of that found across much of Victoria.

Housing in the state of Victoria, Australia is characterised by high rates of private housing ownership, minimal and lack of public housing and high demand for, and largely unaffordable, rental housing. Outside of Melbourne, home to 70% of the state's population, housing and rent is more affordable. In Melbourne, access to public housing is generally better, but housing and rent are less affordable.

Public housing in Victoria is usually provided by departments of the Victorian state government and operates within the framework of the Commonwealth-State Housing Agreement, by which funding for public housing is provided by both federal and state governments.

Since 2010, both Victoria and Melbourne have been experiencing a rapid increase in population, generating high demand for housing. This has created a housing boom, pushing housing prices up and having an effect on rental prices as well as availability of all types of housing.

== Private housing ==
Private housing in Victoria is of a generally high quality, the majority of it being built post-war and late 20th century. However, it suffers from a lack of access to public transport infrastructure and amenity, depending on its location.

Many residents are forced into car ownership to enable access to amenities and services and to provide transport to and from work. Most of the infrastructural problems of private housing are also present in Victoria's rental housing. Public transport mode share in Melbourne is around a mere 10%, while many regional Victorian towns are lower.

In the late 2000s, private housing prices in Australia, relative to average incomes, were among the highest in the world, prompting speculation that the country was experiencing a real estate bubble similar to many other countries.

As of February 2007, mortgage debt was equivalent to 80% of Australian GDP. By 2009, it had risen to its highest levels of all time in Australian history, around triple the private debt during the Great Depression.

According to the 2016 Australian census, 32.3% of dwellings in Victoria are owned outright, 35.3% are owned using a mortgage, while 28.7 are rented.

== Rental housing ==
Rental housing in Victoria is currently in high demand under pressure from high population growth. As a result, rental housing can be difficult to obtain, particularly affordable rental housing. Prospective tenants often offer to pay more rent, several months rent up front and other incentives to landlords to secure housing. There is currently little or no rent control implemented in Victoria.

== Public housing ==
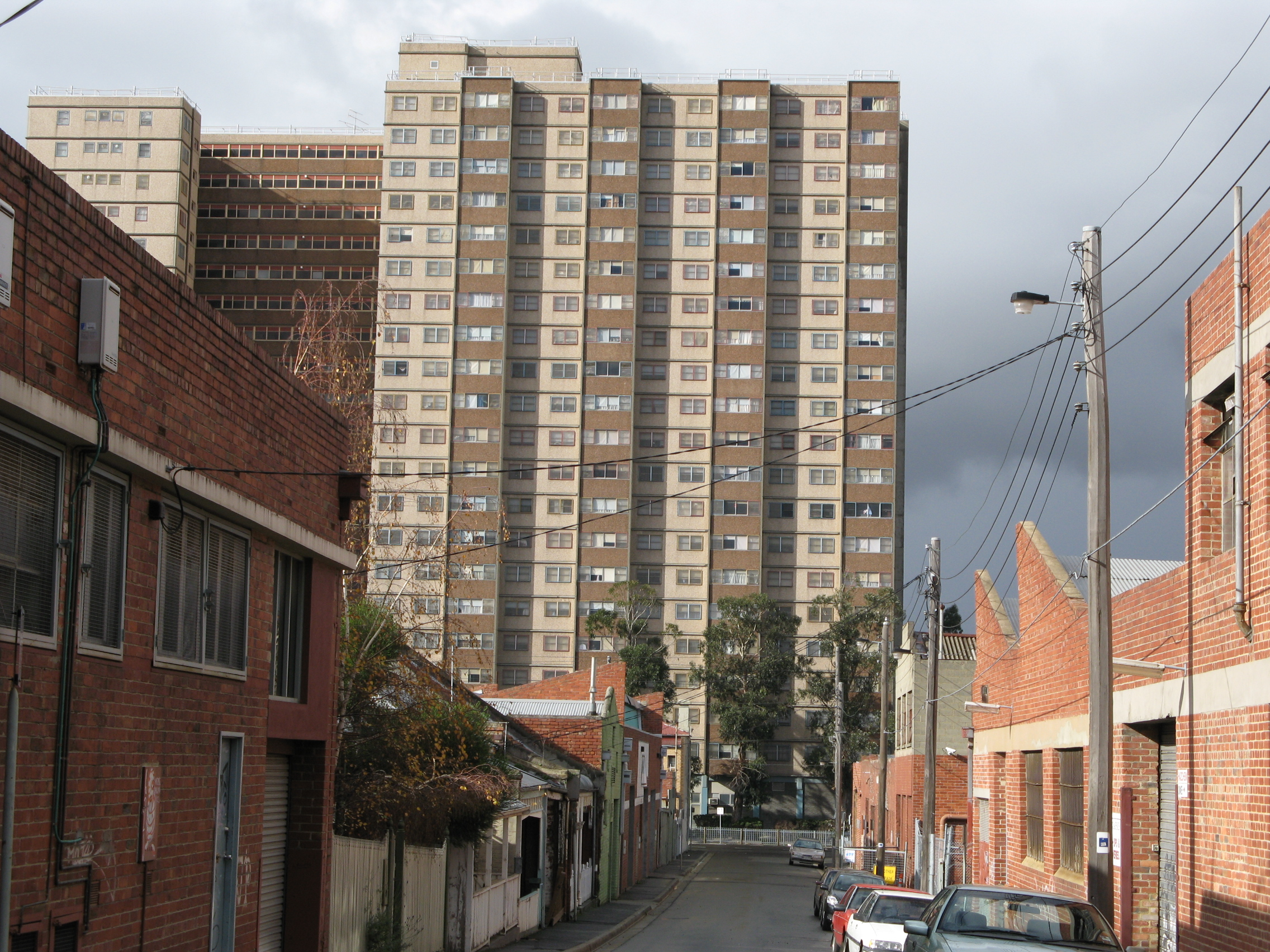
A public housing high rise in Collingwood, Melbourne

Public housing in Victoria is characterised by a general lack of availability and quality, many residents in public housing tend to be low income earners. Infrastructure for public housing is characterised by high-rise buildings built in Melbourne by the Housing Commission of Victoria in the 1960s, almost all of which are still in use today. More recent public housing projects have been of a low to low-medium density.

Access to public housing in Victoria can be difficult as many prospective residents must wait on a waiting lists until rooms and apartments become available. There is a general lack of investment in public housing, leading to a lack of availability and quality.

Similar to other states and territories in Australia, public housing in Victoria is considered to be stigmatised, and often perceived and "framed as places of danger, drugs and vice". This stigma, amongst other factors, can result in people who live in public housing experiencing prejudice and vilification.

== History ==
Victoria's housing history is heavily characterised by the transportation methods in widespread use at the time of housing construction. Inner areas of Melbourne and some regional towns, developed during the late 19th century, enjoy good access to public transport, trains, trams, buses and cycling infrastructure. In contrast, suburban and outer areas of Melbourne and regional towns, developed during the 20th century, suffer from auto-centric urban forms with poor or no access to public transport.

This infrastructure has dictated many elements of housing in Victoria; from private housing prices, rent, general affordability, quality, gentrification and availability of housing, generally increasing where amenity and public transport is best served. Many affluent and gentrified areas have good access to amenity and public transport, while suburban and outer areas are generally cheaper and have poor or no access to good quality amenity and infrastructure.

== Housing types ==
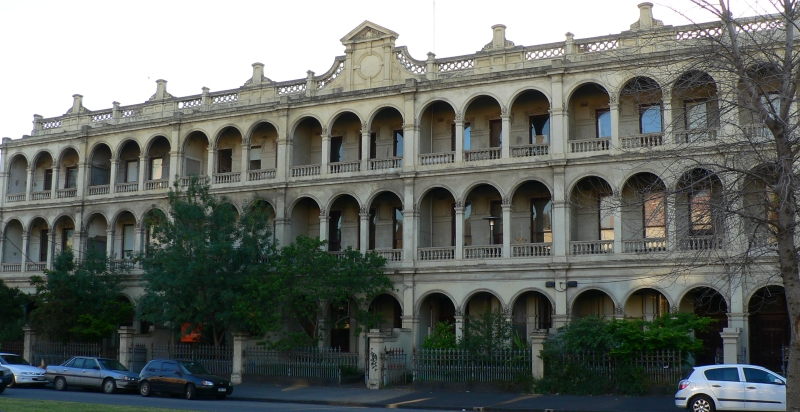
Victorian terrace housing, common in inner city areas of Melbourne and some regional towns

Housing types in Victoria are dominated by single or double-storey detached suburban dwellings, most of which include living spaces such as a family/living room, dining room, etc., a garage, front and/or back yard and a driveway.

In inner Melbourne and some inner areas of regional towns, most housing types are of a low to low-medium density terrace style of varying sizes and levels depending on the historical affluence or lack thereof of the area.

In inner Melbourne and some other areas, high density housing is also present. Shoebox style blocks of flats constructed in the 1960s and 1970s are extremely common throughout the older, inner city suburbs of Melbourne. Many of these are in the Dingbat style. A majority of larger apartment buildings were constructed in Melbourne through the 1990s and 2000s.

== Welfare and support ==
There are a few support and welfare systems available to those living in housing in Victoria, these include access to institutions such as Tenants Unions, government authorities such as the Victorian Civil and Administrative Tribunal and welfare such as 'Rent Assistance' distributed through Centrelink.

== Housing market ==
Since the 1980s the median house price in Victoria has been increasing by 7.9% annually. The median unit/apartment price has been growing up by 7.73% yearly.

== Statistics ==
Statistics available, June 2004:

- Total Population: 4,644, 950
- Total Households: 1,928,617 (May 2010) (Source: http://www.tuv.org.au/articles/files/housing_statistics/housing_and_tenancy_statistics_Victoria_052010.pdf)
- Number Tenant Households: 382,981
- Number of Private Tenant Households: 328,176
- Proportion Households in the Private Rental Market: 17.9%
- Number of Private Tenant Households In Melbourne: 247,208
- Number of Public Tenant Households: 62,645
- Number of recipients of Commonwealth Rent Assistance: 194,507
- Number private tenant households with weekly income is less than $500: 85,186
- Number of residents in Caravan Parks: 15,650
- Number of residents in Rooming Houses: Unknown

=== Other statistics ===
- Proportion of all renters with structural or repair problems with their dwelling:
  - dwellings ten years or less years old: 53.2%
  - dwellings more than ten years old: 66.5%
- Proportion of private rental dwellings with no heating: 10%
- Proportion of rental dwellings with no deadlock on front door: 34%
- Proportion of rental dwellings with no deadlock on back door: 55%

== See also ==
- Home ownership in Australia
- Housing Commission of Victoria
- Minister for Housing (Australia)
- Homelessness in Australia
- Renters and Housing Union
- Jordan van den Lamb
- Minister for Housing (Victoria)
