= Bank of Mum and Dad =

Informal term for parents providing financial support to their children

The "Bank of Mum and Dad" (also styled Bank of Mom and Dad, and abbreviated BOMAD) is an informal term for parents who provide financial support to their adult children, most commonly to help them buy or rent a home. Originally a British expression, the phrase is also used in academic research to describe the broader ways in which parental wealth supports the life chances and careers of people from privileged backgrounds. The term has also been applied to other forms of parental support, including help with education, rent and general living costs.

The phrase came into wider use during the 2010s as house prices rose, and is now a widely recognised expression recorded in major English dictionaries. By the 2020s the practice it describes had become common in several countries' housing markets; in the United Kingdom, estimates suggested that around half of first-time buyers received parental or other family assistance with a purchase, channelling billions of pounds a year to buyers. Researchers have also examined its effects on transitions into home ownership and its relationship to wealth inequality.

== History ==
The expression was in use on both sides of the Atlantic by the second half of the 2000s. In the United States, a 2006 New York Times article titled "The Bank of Mom and Dad" reported that around 34 per cent of Americans aged 18 to 34 received cash from their parents each year. In the United Kingdom, a 2009 article in the British Journal of Hospital Medicine described parents facing growing pressure to help their children with university costs, housing deposits and pension provision. The phrase gained wider prominence during the 2010s amid debate over rising house prices and parental lending; by one count it appeared in European newspapers 763 times in 2018, up from 31 times in 2005. A 2019 report by LSE Consulting for the Family Building Society linked it to sustained house-price rises relative to incomes, the reduced availability of high loan-to-value mortgages after the 2007 to 2008 global financial crisis, and the growing housing wealth of older home owners.

== Prevalence ==
=== United Kingdom ===
In the United Kingdom, the estate agency Savills estimated that around 52 per cent of first-time buyers received family help to buy a home in 2024, lending or gifting an average of about 55,000 pounds each, or some 9.6 billion pounds in total. Writing in The Guardian, the historian Eliza Filby argued that, if treated as a single financial institution, the British "Bank of Mum and Dad" would rank among the country's ten largest mortgage lenders.

=== Australia ===
In Australia, national survey data from the Australian National University's ANUpoll indicated that the share of home owners who reported receiving financial help from family to buy their home rose from about 22 per cent in 2017 to about 25 per cent in early 2024. A 2019 report drawing on data from Digital Finance Analytics estimated that about 20 per cent of first home buyers relied on a parental loan, and that such lending, taken together, would rank among the country's largest home loan providers.

=== United States ===
In the United States, a 2025 Federal Reserve Board working paper reported that around 30 per cent of first-time buyers received direct parental help with a down payment between 2009 and 2016, up from earlier in the century. Using an economic model, it estimated that parental transfers accounted for about 27 per cent of the home ownership rate among younger households.

== Forms of assistance ==
Parents most often help through cash gifts or loans, by acting as a guarantor on a child's mortgage, or by becoming a co-borrower. These forms differ in their tax treatment: such gifts are generally untaxed in Canada and usually fall below federal gift tax thresholds in the United States, while in the United Kingdom they can attract inheritance tax unless the giver survives seven years, subject to an annual exemption of 3,000 pounds.

== Economic and social impact ==
Because such support depends on a family's existing wealth, commentators have raised concerns that it may deepen inequality between those who can draw on family wealth and those who cannot. A 2025 study of Australian survey data by Melek Cigdem-Bayram, Stephen Whelan and Gavin Wood found that transfers had only a modest direct effect on overall wealth inequality, but concluded that by hastening entry into home ownership they could widen inequality within a generation over time. A 2025 study of Sweden by Nils Landén Mammos found that access to parental housing equity also weakened the effect of a loan-to-value cap on mortgages, as buyers with family support could stay within the cap while still paying more for their homes. The phenomenon has been linked to the idea of an "inheritocracy", a term used by the historian Eliza Filby for a society in which life chances depend heavily on inherited wealth.

In sociology, the phrase has been used to describe how parental money shapes careers as well as housing. Sam Friedman and Daniel Laurison argued that parental support helps propel the careers of people from privileged backgrounds, and a 2021 study of Norway by Maren Toft and Sam Friedman found that parental wealth was a leading factor behind the "class ceiling", a pay gap in which people from working class backgrounds earn less than privileged colleagues in the same elite jobs.

== See also ==
- Allowance for children
- Inheritance
- Estate planning
- Loan guarantee
- Reverse mortgage
