= Filtering (housing) =

Reduction of housing prices with age

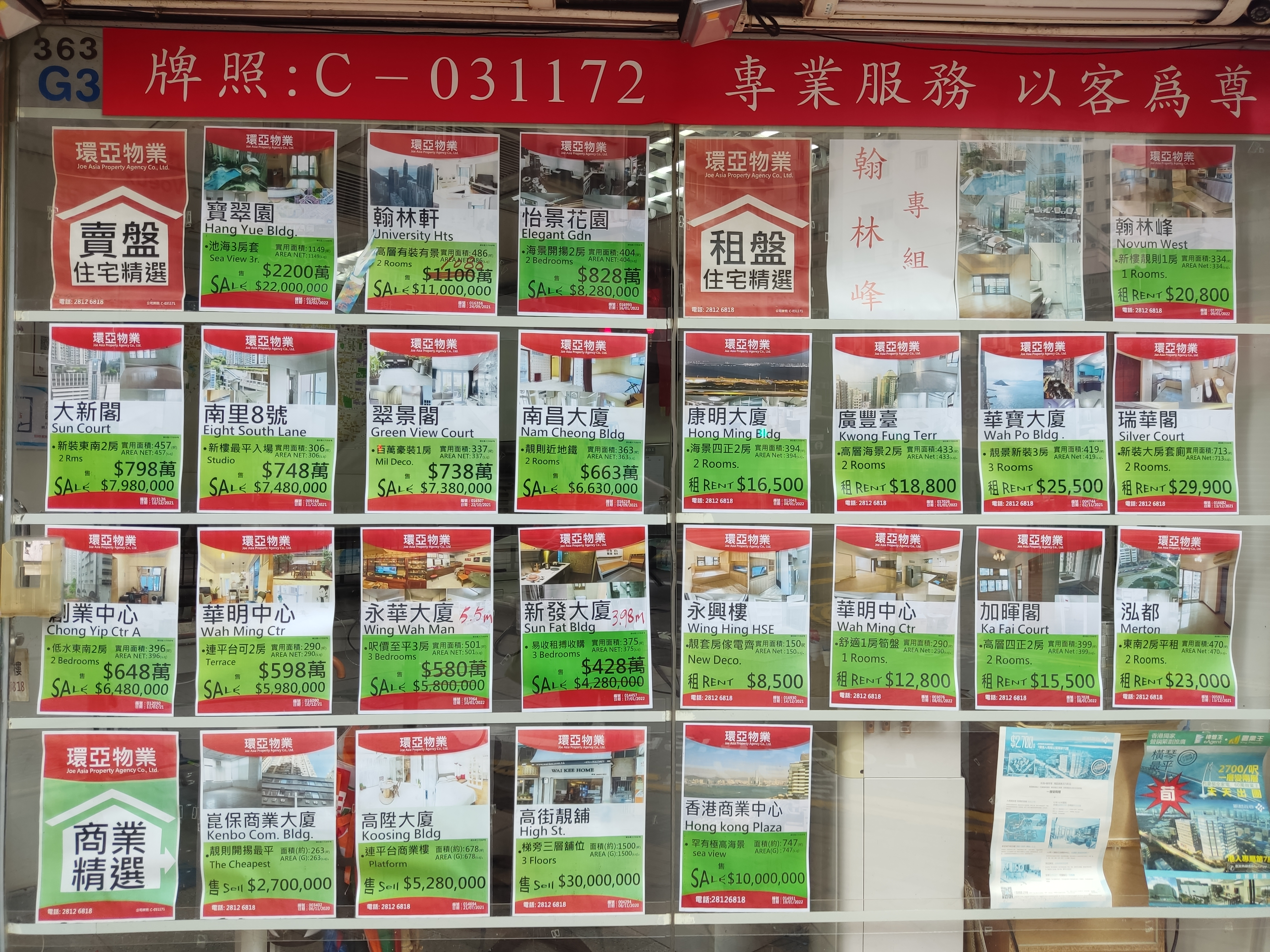
Real estate advertisements in Hong Kong

In housing economics, filtering is the process by which a housing unit becomes more affordable with age. In markets with sufficient housing supply, homes will command the highest prices and rents when brand new, and depreciate over time as they get older. Thus, new construction will tend to be occupied by higher-income groups at first, but successively filter (become accessible) to lower-income groups over time.

Importantly, filtering depends upon sufficient supply (either from new construction in a growing area, or depopulation — see Housing in Japan). In markets with insufficient housing supply, reverse or upward filtering can occur. This is when units once occupied by lower-income residents quickly appreciate and become occupied by higher-income residents (see also gentrification). As a consequence, increased supply in new market-rate housing (which tends to be occupied by higher-income individuals) is associated with increased housing affordability for lower-income individuals, as higher-income individuals vacate old housing or stop competing for old housing.

== Prevalence ==
A 2025 study of the German housing market found that increases in new housing supply led to rent reductions across all market segments of housing, as new housing causes moving chains that free up second-hand housing.

A 2014 Syracuse University study found that, in the United States, "the nation's housing stock filters down at a rate of roughly 1.9 percent per year in real terms". In other words, people buying a 50-year-old home would have about 60 percent less real income than those buying a newly built home.

Declines in new construction can lead to decreased filtering. A 2020 study by the National Multifamily Housing Council explained:

In decades past it was the substantial flow of new construction, largely targeted to middle- and higher-income groups, that enabled the filtering process to operate. In the face of its current constriction, well below levels normally associated with employment growth, we gain fresh appreciation for the broader benefits of housing construction.
