= Negative gearing =

Financial leverage

Negative gearing is a financial leverage strategy whereby an investor borrows money to acquire an income-producing investment, knowing that the gross income generated by the investment (at least in the short term) will be less than the cost of owning and managing the investment, including depreciation and interest charged on the loan (but excluding capital repayments).

Investors may choose this approach expecting an overall reduction in tax in the short term, if a loss on a negatively geared investment is tax-deductible against other taxable income. They may also benefit from the capital gain on the investment when it is eventually is sold, especially if the capital gain on the sale is given a favourable tax treatment. If these benefits exceed the accumulated losses of holding the investment, the investor will make a profit.

== Overview ==
Negative gearing is often discussed with regard to real estate, where rental income is less than mortgage loan interest costs, but may also apply to shares in companies whose dividend income falls short of interest costs on a margin loan. The tax treatment may or may not be the same between the two.

Positive gearing occurs when one borrows to invest in an income-producing asset and the returns (income) from that asset exceed the cost of borrowing. From then on, the investor must pay tax on the rental income profit until the asset is sold, at which point the investor must pay capital gains tax on any profit.

When the income generated covers the interest, it is simply a geared investment, which creates passive income. A negative gearing strategy makes a profit under any of the following circumstances:

- if the asset rises in value so that the capital gain is more than the sum of the ongoing losses over the life of the investment;
- if the income stream rises to become greater than the cost of interest (the investment becomes positively geared); or
- if the interest cost falls because of lower interest rates or paying down the loan principal, making the investment positively geared.

The investor must be able to fund any shortfall until the asset is sold or until the investment becomes positively geared. The different tax treatment of planned ongoing losses and possible future capital gains affects the investor's final return. In countries that tax capital gains at a lower rate than income, it is possible for an investor to make a loss overall before taxation but a small gain after taxpayer subsidies.

Some countries, including Australia (until 1 July 2027) and Japan, allow unrestricted use of negative gearing losses to offset income from other sources. Several other OECD countries, including the USA, New Zealand, Germany, Sweden, Canada and France, allow loss offsetting with some restrictions. Applying tax deductions from negatively geared investment housing to other income is not permitted in the United Kingdom or the Netherlands. With respect to investment decisions and market prices, other taxes such as stamp duties and capital gains tax may be more or less onerous in those countries, increasing or decreasing the attractiveness of residential property as an investment.

A negatively-geared investment property will generally remain negatively geared for several years, when the rental income will have increased with inflation to the point that the investment is positively geared (the rental income is greater than the interest cost).

The tax treatment of negative gearing (also termed "rental loss offset against other income") varies. For example:

- the United States restricts the practice to lower/middle income taxpayers who are active in managing their rental investment and also allows interest costs against the family home to be fully tax deductible.
- Canada limits the practice by ensuring the investment generated a positive return over its life.
- countries with lower tax rates have a lower benefit from negative gearing due to a lower top rate of tax or a higher threshold for a specific tax rate.

== Taxation implications of negative gearing by country ==
=== Australia ===
Negative gearing can be a tax-effective strategy in Australia, because the tax system has a single income tax schedule for income from all sources. This means that for taxation purposes net investment income losses can be offset against other types of income, such as wage or business income, with only a few limits or restrictions.

Negative gearing is a controversial political wedge issue in Australia, most notably during the 2016 and the 2019 federal elections, during which the Australian Labor Party (ALP) proposed to eliminate the tax-deductibility of negative gearing losses against non-investment income (with some exceptions), and to halve the capital gains tax discount to 25%. Analysis found that negative gearing in Australia provides a greater benefit to wealthier Australians than the less wealthy.

Federal Treasurer at the time, Scott Morrison, in defence of negative gearing, cited tax data that showed that numerous middle income groups (he mentioned teachers, nurses, and electricians) benefit in larger numbers from negative gearing than finance managers. In the 2026 Australian federal budget, the Albanese government banned negative gearing, with exceptions for newly-built homes and pre-existing negatively geared dwellings. These changes are expected to commence on 1 July 2027.

=== United Kingdom ===
While allowing for negative gearing in its basic form, the United Kingdom does not allow the transfer of one type of income (or loss) to another type of income. This is due to its schedular system of taxation. In this type of taxation system, the tax paid is dependent on income source. Therefore, an individual who received an income from labour and from land would pay two separate tax rates for the two relevant income sources.

Between 1997 and 2007, the Tax Law Rewrite Project changed this system by simplifying the schedules. As with the previous system, people would not be allowed to transfer incomes (or losses).

A UK government online resource on renting out property in England and Wales outlines how to offset losses. It states that losses can be offset against "future profits by carrying it forward to a later year" or against "profits from other properties (if you have them)".

=== New Zealand ===
The Opposition Labour Party attempted to raise negative gearing in the 2011 election, but after their failure to win government the issue reduced in significance.

The Sixth Labour Government took measures to restrict negative gearing, initially by ring-fencing residential property losses against residential property income in 2019. They subsequently abolished negative gearing entirely in March 2021 by eliminating interest deductibility on residential property, and it was scheduled to be fully phased out by April 2025. However, the new National-led government elected in 2023 reversed this change and restored interest deductibility on investment properties.

The New Zealand government's 2025 Rental Income Guide note that there are limitations on the deductibility of expenses associated with mixed-use property if it is rented out at below market rates.

=== Canada ===
Canada allows the transfer of income streams in some situations.

Personal business expenses may always be deducted from personal business income. If those expenses exceed business incomes (i.e., the business is losing money for tax purposes), the resulting "non-capital loss" may be deducted from other personal incomes, so long as the Canada Revenue Agency (CRA) believes that it is a genuine business (and not a personal activity being used to generate tax losses). This loss may also be carried back up to 3 years, or carried forward up to 20 years, to offset income earned in those years.

Interest paid on a loan can be treated as a business expense, so long as the money was borrowed to generate income.

Claim the following carrying charges and interest you paid to earn income from investments: [...] Most interest you pay on money you borrow for investment purposes, but generally only if you use it to try to earn investment income, including interest and dividends. However, if the only earnings your investment can produce are capital gains, you cannot claim the interest you paid.

=== United States ===
In principle, the US federal tax does not allow the transfer of income streams. In general, taxpayers can only deduct expenses of renting property from their rental income, as renting property out is usually considered a passive activity. However, if renters are considered to have actively participated in the activities, they can claim deductions from rental losses against their other "nonpassive income". A definition of "active participation" is outlined in the "Reporting Rental Income, Expenses, and Losses" guide:

You actively participated in a rental real estate activity if you (and your spouse) owned at least 10% of the rental property and you made management decisions or arranged for others to provide services (such as repairs) in a significant and bona fide sense. Management decisions that may count as active participation include approving new tenants, deciding on rental terms, approving expenditures, and other similar decisions.

It is possible to deduct any loss against other incomes, depending on a range of factors.

=== Japan ===
Japan allows tax payers to offset rental losses against other income.

Individuals can claim losses against rental loss with minimal restrictions, but if the property was owned through a partnership or trust there are restrictions.

There are a number of additional rules, such as restricting claims of losses due to Bad Debt. Additional information can be found in the Japan Tax Site.

=== Germany ===
The German tax system is complex, but within the bounds of standard federal income tax, Germany does allow the transfer of income under certain conditions. Rental losses can be offset against rental income and against income from other income streams including employment income, income from independent personal services and trade and business income. In order for losses from renting and leasing to be offset against income or profits from other types of income, it must be established that there is an intention to generate a profit from the source of income generating the losses. In the case of real estate that is rented out for regular residential purposes, the German tax authorities generally assume an intention to generate a profit, unless the real estate is rented out at unusual low conditions (less than 2/3 of a comparable rent).

Germany recognises seven sources of income:

1. Agriculture and forestry
2. Trade and business
3. Independent personal services
4. Employment
5. Capital investment
6. Rents and royalties
7. "other income", as specified and strictly limited by law to certain types of income such as income from private transactions and income of a recurring nature (e.g. pensions)

The income from each of these sources is calculated separately.

Rental income is taxed as income and is subject to the progressive tax rate. Interest on loans provided to finance real estate, expenses, and property-related cost (e.g., management fees, insurance) can be deducted from the taxable rental income.

If real estate is held as private assets (i.e. not as a business asset), the gain from the sale of a property after a holding period of more than 10 years is generally tax-free respectively does not constitute taxable income. However, there are exceptions to this rule, e.g. it is assumed that the sale of three "objects" (individual properties, real estate or rights equivalent to real estate) within 5 years constitutes a business activity and that the income generated from the sale is therefore business income and not possibly tax-exempt "other income".

=== Netherlands ===
In principle, the Dutch tax system does not allow the transfer of income. Most citizens calculate tax, separately, in 3 income groups:

1. Box 1 income includes income from employment and income from the primary residence
2. Box 2 income, which includes income from a substantial holding in a company, as well as gains from substantial shareholdings
3. Box 3 deals with income from savings and investments

Dutch resident and non-resident companies and partnerships owning Dutch property are in principle allowed to deduct interest expenses on loans from banks or affiliated companies, and property-related costs from their taxable income.

== See also ==
- Debt
- Financial engineering
- Leveraged buyout
- Rent seeking
