= Median household income in Australia and New Zealand =

Median total household weekly income in Australia divided geographically by statistical local area, as of the 2011 census

Australian total gross income per capita

Median household income is commonly used to measure the relative prosperity of populations in different geographical locations. It divides households into two equal segments with the first half of households earning less than the median household income and the other half earning more.

New Zealand and Australia are gradually being economically integrated through a process known as "Closer Economic Relations (CER)". Their citizens are free to travel, live and work in either country. Information about their relative median household incomes is of interest, especially for those considering migration.

The latest release shows that the median gross household income in 2013–2014 was $80,704, and the average of all households was $107,276.

== Median household income in NZ 2004–2008 ==
Median weekly household income in New Zealand increased at a rate of about 3.5% a year from 2004 to 2008. In June 2004 it was (NZ)$992, June 2005 was $1,040, June 2006 was $1,129, June 2007 was $1,203, June 2008 was $1,271.

== Median household income in NZ 2009–2011 ==
Median weekly household income in New Zealand fell slightly or stagnated from 2009 to 2010 during the "great recession" period. In June 2009 it was $1,234 and June 2010 it was $1,236. In 2011 household incomes recovered to beyond the high of 2008 again – median weekly household incomes increased again to $1,289.

== Median household income in 2007–2008 ==
Income data for each state (or territory) has been converted to U.S. dollars using purchasing power parity for private and public consumption. This is done because it provides a more accurate and stable assessment of the true value of citizens' incomes in diverse countries.

Location	Population	Median household income (local currency)	Median household income (PPP US$)
Australia	19,855,328	$66,820	$43,960
New South Wales	6,549,177	$66,820	$43,960
Victoria	4,932,422	$66,872	$43,994
Queensland	3,904,532	$68,276	$44,918
Western Australia	1,959,084	$72,800	$47,894
South Australia	1,514,377	$55,848	$36,742
Australian Capital Territory	324,034	$91,624	$60,278
Northern Territory	192,898	$86,788	$57,097
Tasmania	476,481	$50,705	
New Zealand	4,100,000	$67,028 (Average, not median)	$44,985

Main source: Australian Bureau of Statistics, Household Income and Income Distribution, Australia 2007–08 . Note : The NZ figure is Average Household Income and not Median Household Income. No source for Median Income found. The figure for NZ Median Household Income is likely to be slightly less. Note: GDP per capita cannot be used to predict median household income (See median household income).

== Median household income in 2011–2012 ==
There were no significant changes in income between 2009–10 and 2011–12.

Location	Population	Median household income (local currency)	Median household income (PPP US$)
Australia	22,189,000	$75,241	$48,858
Australian Capital Territory	359,700	$110,827	$71,966
Northern Territory (Note: Households in districts defined as very remote were excluded. This accounts for roughly 23% of the population of the Northern Territory.)	176,600	$101,435	$65,867
Western Australia	2,296,000	$85,469	$55,499
Queensland	4,477,100	$73,154	$47,503
Victoria	5,564,700	$74,094	$48,113
New South Wales	7,210,700	$75,763	$49,197
South Australia	1,614,200	$64,597	$41,946
Tasmania	499,000	$59,066	$38,355
New Zealand			

== Median gross household income in 2013–2014 ==
The median gross household income in 2013–2014 was $80,704.

== Median gross household income in 2017–2018 ==
The median gross household income in 2017-2018 is A$1,701 per week or A$88,695 per year. As of 30 June 2018 (end of fiscal year), one Australia dollar is equivalent of 0.7406 U.S. dollar. Using this exchange rate, the median gross household income in Australia is US$65,687 in 2017–18.

== See also ==
- Economy of Australia
- Homelessness in Australia
- Home-ownership in Australia
- List of Australian states and territories by gross state product
- Median household income
- Poverty in Australia
