= List of Australian states and territories by gross state product =

This is the most recent list of Australian states and territories by gross state product (GSP) and GSP per capita. Also included are the GSP and population growth tables as well as a comparison table showing the surplus/deficit between state final demand (SFD) and GSP for the same financial year. All the data was taken from the Australian Bureau of Statistics website.

== States and territories by GSP and growth ==
> 500,000 500,000 - 300,000 200,000 - 100,000 < 100,000

State or territory	Annual Growth Rate (%, 2024-25)	GSP (million $AUD, FY 2024-5)	GSP (million $AUD, FY 2009-10)
Australian Capital Territory	▲3.54%	57,582	29,917
Queensland	▲2.23%	523,847	295,005
Western Australia	▲1.31%	461,658	213,988
Victoria	▲1.13%	615,414	360,958
South Australia	▲1.0%	151,803	98,685
Tasmania	▲1.0%	42,821	27,350
Northern Territory	▲1.04%	33,960	26,435
New South Wales	▲0.95%	829,130	500,556
Australia (GDP)	▲1.35%	2,716,216	1,542,946

== States and territories by GSP per capita ==
> 100,000 155,000 - 95,000 95,000 - 85,000 85,000 - 75,000 < 75,000

State or territory	GSP per capita (A$, 2024–25)	GSP per capita growth (2024–25)	GSP per capita as a ratio to national
Western Australia	151,677	▲0.48%	1.542
Northern Territory	128,442	▲4.60%	1.306
Australian Capital Territory	118,775	▲3.96%	1.207
New South Wales	96,479	▲1.22%	0.981
Queensland	92,392	▲2.11%	0.939
Victoria	86,990	▲1.52%	0.884
South Australia	79,780	▲1.19%	0.811
Tasmania	74,342	▲1.38%	0.756
Australia (GDP)	98,362	▲1.43%	1.000

== States and territories by population growth ==
State or territory	Population (June 2010)	Population (June 2024)	National population share (%, June 2024)	Annual Growth Rate (2019–24)	Comparison as multiple of (June 2010 vs. June 2024)
Victoria	5,461,101	7,011,100	26.07%	▲1.49%	1.226
Australian Capital Territory	361,766	481,713	1.68%	▲1.13%	1.192
Queensland	4,404,744	5,618,800	20.15%	▲1.58%	1.175
Western Australia	2,290,845	3,008,700	10.36%	▲1.47%	1.162
New South Wales	7,144,292	8,545,100	31.79%	▲0.95%	1.143
South Australia	1,627,322	1,817,900	6.89%	▲0.95%	1.087
Northern Territory	255,407	262.200	0.96%	▼0.07%	1.071
Tasmania	530,100	575,800	2.10%	▲1.11%	1.062
Australia (GDP)	22,028,695	27,321,313	100.00%	▲1.27%	1.166

== States and territories by comparison between SFD and GSP ==
State or territory	SFD (million A$, 2019–20)	GSP (million A$, 2018–19)	Surplus / Deficit
New South Wales	603,043	629,117	26,074
Victoria	483,407	461,248	−22,159
Queensland	361,478	367,468	5,990
Western Australia	203,910	288,225	84,315
South Australia	118,626	109,843	−8,783
Australian Capital Territory	54,040	39,956	−14,084
Tasmania	35,142	31,993	−4,099
Northern Territory	23,482	24,830	1,348
Australia (GDP)	1,884,078	1,952,680	68,602

== Cities by GDP and GDP per capita ==
Rank	City	GDP (million A$, 2018–19)	GSP per capita (A$, 2018–19)
1	Sydney	461,440	86,500
2	Melbourne	369,439	72,600
3	Brisbane	177,006	70,300
4	Perth	146,880	70,300
5	Adelaide	85,254	62,600
6	Canberra	40,879	96,500

== Historical gross state product (since 1989–90) ==
Gross State Product (million A$) since 1989–90

New South Wales

Victoria

Queensland

Western Australia

South Australia

Australian Capital Territory

Tasmania

Northern Territory

Australia (GDP)

== See also ==
- Economy of Australia
- Home ownership in Australia
- Median household income in Australia and New Zealand
- States and territories of Australia
