= List of electoral divisions in Queensland =

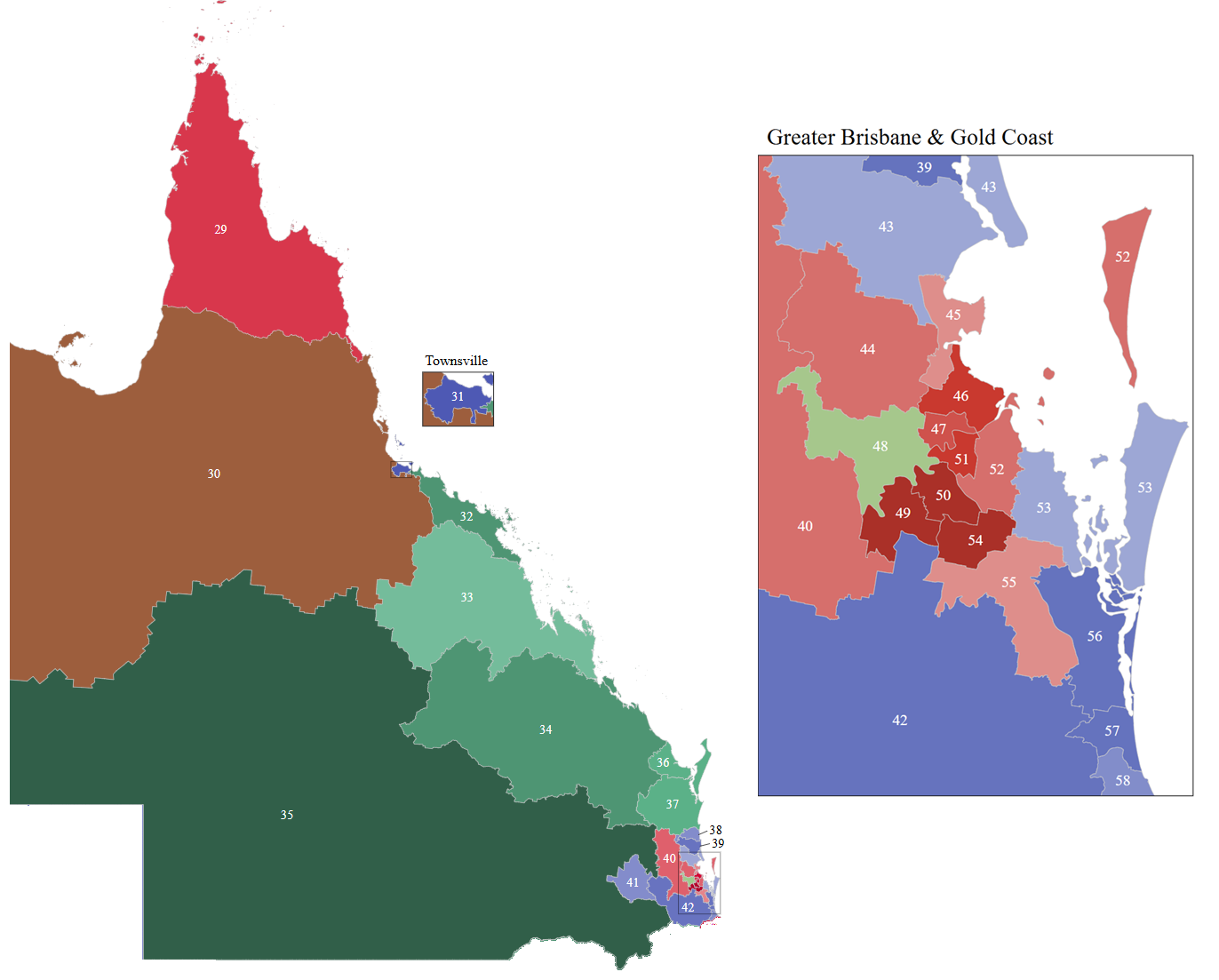
Results of the 2025 federal election

The Australian state of Queensland is divided into 30 electoral divisions for the purposes of electing the Australian House of Representatives. At the 2025 federal election, the Liberal National Party of Queensland won 16 seats, the Australian Labor Party won 12 seats, the Greens won 1 seats, Katter's Australian Party won 1 seat.

== Divisions ==
Name	Formed	Size (km^{2})	Classification	Current Member	Member's Party	References
Blair	1998	6,472	Provincial	Shayne Neumann	Labor	
Bonner	2004	374	Outer-metropolitan	Kara Cook	Labor	
Bowman	1949	536	Outer-metropolitan	Henry Pike	Liberal National	
Brisbane	1901	57	Inner-metropolitan	Madonna Jarrett	Labor	
Capricornia	1901	90,903	Provincial	Michelle Landry	Liberal National	
Dawson	1949	14,630	Rural	Andrew Willcox	Liberal National	
Dickson	1992	724	Outer-metropolitan	Ali France	Labor	
Fadden	1977	387	Outer-metropolitan	Cameron Caldwell	Liberal National	
Fairfax	1984	1,004	Rural	Ted O'Brien	Liberal National	
Fisher	1949	1,198	Rural	Andrew Wallace	Liberal National	
Flynn	2006	132,824	Rural	Colin Boyce	Liberal National	
Forde	1984	418	Outer-metropolitan	Rowan Holzberger	Labor	
Griffith	1934	57	Inner-metropolitan	Renee Coffey	Labor	
Groom	1984	5,586	Provincial	Garth Hamilton	Liberal National	
Herbert	1901	941	Provincial	Phillip Thompson	Liberal National	
Hinkler	1984	3,818	Provincial	David Batt	Liberal National	
Kennedy	1901	567,377	Rural	Bob Katter	Katter's Australian	
Leichhardt	1949	148,559	Rural	Matt Smith	Labor	
Lilley	1913	144	Inner-metropolitan	Anika Wells	Labor	
Longman	1996	1,237	Provincial	Terry Young	Liberal National	
Maranoa	1901	729,897	Rural	David Littleproud	Liberal National	
McPherson	1949	229	Provincial	Leon Rebello	Liberal National	
Moncrieff	1984	100	Provincial	Angie Bell	Liberal National	
Moreton	1901	109	Inner-metropolitan	Julie-Ann Campbell	Labor	
Oxley	1949	159	Outer-metropolitan	Milton Dick	Labor	
Petrie	1949	152	Outer-metropolitan	Emma Comer	Labor	
Rankin	1984	131	Outer-metropolitan	Jim Chalmers	Labor	
Ryan	1949	370	Outer-metropolitan	Elizabeth Watson-Brown	Greens	
Wide Bay	1901	14,227	Rural	Llew O'Brien	Liberal National	
Wright	2009	7,577	Rural	Scott Buchholz	Liberal National	

== See also ==
- Parliament of Queensland
