= Queensland =

State of Australia

- State
- Flag Coat of arms
- Nickname(s): The Sunshine State
- Motto: Audax at Fidelis (Latin) (English: Bold but Faithful)
- Location of Queensland in Australia
- Country: Australia
- First British settlement: September 1824 (Moreton Bay)
- Separation from New South Wales: 6 June 1859 (as Colony of Queensland)
- Federation: 1 January 1901
- Named after: Queen Victoria
- Capital and largest city: Brisbane; 27°28′08″S 153°1′25″E
- Administration: 77 local government areas
- Demonym(s): Queenslander
- Government: Federated parliamentary constitutional monarchy
  - Monarch: Charles III
  - Governor: Thomas Bradley
  - Premier: David Crisafulli (LNP)
- Legislature: Parliament of Queensland
- Judiciary: Supreme Court of Queensland and lower courts

Parliament of the Commonwealth
  - Senate: 12 senators (of 76)
  - House of Representatives: 30 seats (of 150)

Area
  - Total: 1,729,742 km^{2} (667,857 sq mi) (2nd)
- Highest elevation (Mount Bartle Frere): 1,622 m (5,322 ft)

Population
  - 2026-03 estimate: ▲5,739,461 (3rd)
  - Density: 3.32/km^{2} (8.6/sq mi) (5th)
- GSP: 2021 estimate
  - Total: ▲AU$503.4 billion (3rd)
  - Per capita: ▲AU$73,030 (5th)
- HDI (2023): ▲0.947 very high · 5th
- Time zone: UTC+10:00 (AEST)
- Postal abbreviation: QLD
- ISO 3166 code: AU–QLD
- Symbols
- Bird: Brolga (Grus rubicunda)
- Fish: Barrier Reef Anemone Fish (Amphiprion akindynos)
- Flower: Cooktown orchid (Dendrobium phalaenopsis)
- Mammal: Koala (Phascolarctos cinereus)
- Colour(s): Maroon (official and sport) Blue (government logo and branding, since 2025)
- Fossil: Muttaburrasaurus langdoni
- Mineral: Sapphire
- Website: qld.gov.au

Queensland (locally /ˈkwiːnzlænd/ KWEENZ-land, (Note: In the UK and US, /ˈkwiːnzlənd/ KWEENZ-lənd is the preferred variant, though Australians generally regard this as incorrect.) commonly abbreviated as QLD or Qld) is a state in northeastern Australia, the second-largest and third-most-populous state in Australia. It is bordered by the Northern Territory, South Australia and New South Wales to the west, south-west and south, respectively. To the east, Queensland is bounded by the Coral Sea and the Pacific Ocean; to the state's north is the Torres Strait, separating the Australian mainland from Papua New Guinea, and the Gulf of Carpentaria to the north-west. With an area of 1,723,030 square kilometres (665,270 sq mi), Queensland is the world's sixth-largest subdivision of any country on earth; it is larger than all but 16 countries. Due to its size, Queensland's geographical features and climates are diverse, and include tropical rainforests, rivers, coral reefs, mountain ranges and white sandy beaches in its tropical and sub-tropical coastal regions, as well as deserts and savanna in the semi-arid and desert climatic regions of its interior.

Queensland has a population of over 5.7 million, concentrated in South East Queensland, where nearly three in four reside. The capital and largest city in the state is Brisbane, Australia's third-largest city and comprising fully half of the state's population. Ten of Australia's thirty largest cities are located in Queensland, the largest outside Brisbane being the Gold Coast, the Sunshine Coast, Townsville, Cairns, Ipswich, and Toowoomba. 24.2% of the state's population were born overseas. The state has the highest inter-state net migration in Australia.

Queensland was first inhabited by Aboriginal Australians, with the Torres Strait Islands inhabited by Torres Strait Islanders. Dutch navigator Willem Janszoon, the first European to land in Australia, explored the west coast of the Cape York Peninsula in 1606. In 1770, James Cook claimed the east coast of Australia for the Kingdom of Great Britain. In 1788, Arthur Phillip founded the colony of New South Wales, which included all of what is now Queensland. Queensland was explored in subsequent decades, and the Moreton Bay Penal Settlement was established at Brisbane in 1824 by John Oxley. During the Australian frontier wars of the 19th century, colonists killed tens of thousands of Aboriginal people in Queensland while consolidating their control over the territory.

On 6 June 1859 (now commemorated as Queensland Day), Queen Victoria signed the letters patent to establish the colony of Queensland, separating it from New South Wales and thereby establishing Queensland as a self-governing Crown colony with responsible government. Queensland was named for Queen Victoria, by the authority of Queen Victoria, based on a suggestion from Queen Victoria. Queensland's colonial economy was largely agricultural, and sugar and cotton sectors relied on blackbirded South Sea Islander labour.

Queensland was among the six colonies which became the founding states of Australia with Federation on 1 January 1901. Since the Bjelke-Petersen era of the late 20th century, Queensland has received a high level of internal migration from the other states and territories of Australia and remains a popular destination for interstate migration.

Queensland has the third-largest economy among Australian states, with strengths in mining, agriculture, transportation, international education, insurance, and banking. Nicknamed the Sunshine State for its tropical and sub-tropical climates, Great Barrier Reef, and numerous beaches, tourism is also important to the state's economy.

== History ==
=== Pre-European contact ===
Queensland was one of the largest regions of pre-colonial Aboriginal population in Australia. The Aboriginal ownership of Queensland is thought to predate 50,000 BC, and early migrants are believed to have arrived via boat or land bridge across Torres Strait. Through time, their descendants developed into more than 90 different language and cultural groups.

During the last ice age, Queensland's landscape became more arid and largely desolate, making food and other supplies scarce. The people developed the world's first seed-grinding technology. The end of the glacial period brought about a warming climate, making the land more hospitable. It brought high rainfall along the eastern coast, stimulating the growth of the state's tropical rainforests.

The Torres Strait Islands is home to the Torres Strait Islander peoples. Torres Strait Islanders are ethnically and culturally distinct from mainland Aboriginal peoples. They have a long history of interaction with both Aboriginal peoples of what is now Australia and the peoples of New Guinea.

=== European colonisation ===
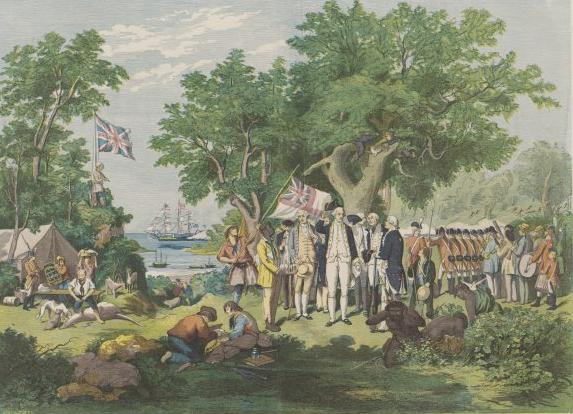
Captain James Cook claims the east coast of Australia for the Kingdom of Great Britain at Possession Island in 1770

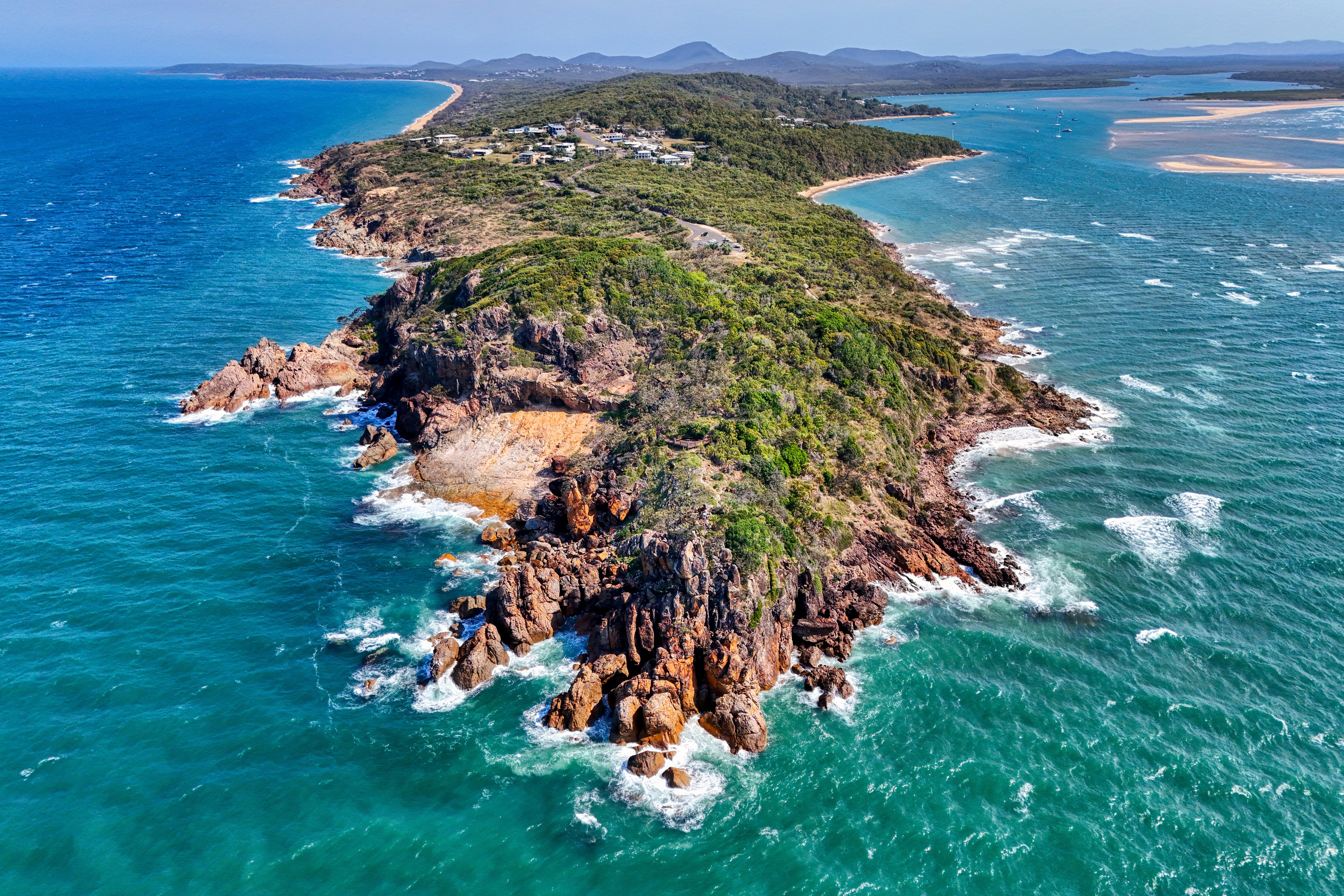
The peninsula of Seventeen Seventy, Queensland, where Captain Cook landed in 1770

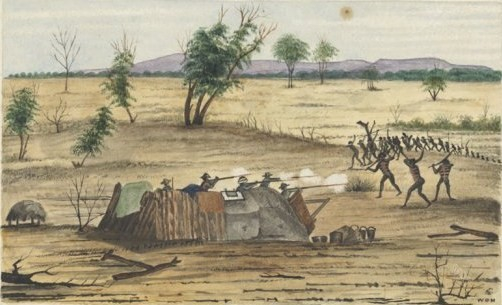
Fighting between Burke and Wills's supply party and Aboriginal Australians at Bulla in 1861

In February 1606, Dutch navigator Willem Janszoon landed near the site of what is now Weipa, on the western shore of Cape York. This was the first recorded landing of a European in Australia, and it also marked the first reported contact between Europeans and the Aboriginal people of Australia. The region was also explored by French and Spanish explorers (commanded by Louis Antoine de Bougainville and Luís Vaez de Torres, respectively) before the arrival of Lieutenant James Cook in 1770. Cook claimed the east coast under instruction from King George III of the Kingdom of Great Britain on 22 August 1770 at Possession Island, naming eastern Australia, including Queensland, New South Wales.

The Aboriginal population declined significantly after a smallpox epidemic during the late 18th century and massacres by the European settlers.

In 1823, John Oxley, a British explorer, sailed north from what is now Sydney to scout possible penal colony sites in Gladstone (then Port Curtis) and Moreton Bay. At Moreton Bay, he found the Brisbane River. He returned in 1824 and established a penal settlement at what is now Redcliffe. The settlement, initially known as Edenglassie, was then transferred to the current location of the Brisbane city centre. Edmund Lockyer discovered outcrops of coal along the banks of the upper Brisbane River in 1825. In 1839 transportation of convicts was ceased, culminating in the closure of the Brisbane penal settlement. In 1842 free settlement, which had already commenced, was officially permitted. In 1847, the Port of Maryborough was opened as a wool port. While most early immigrants came from New South Wales, the first free immigrant ship to arrive in Moreton Bay from Europe was the Artemisia, in 1848.

Earlier than this immigrant ship was the arrival of the Irish famine orphan girls to Queensland. Devised by the then British Secretary of State for the Colonies, The Earl Grey Scheme established a special emigration scheme which was designed to resettle destitute girls from the workhouses of Ireland during the Great Famine. The first ship, the "Earl Grey", departed Ireland for a 124-day sail to Sydney. After controversy developed upon their arrival in Australia, a small group of 37 young orphans, sometimes referred to as The Belfast Girls or the Feisty Colleens, never set foot on Sydney soil, and instead sailed up to Brisbane (then Moreton Bay) on 21 October 1848 on board the Ann Mary. This scheme continued until 1852.

In 1857, Queensland's first lighthouse was built at Cape Moreton.

=== Frontier wars and massacres ===
The frontier wars fought between European settlers and Aboriginal tribes in Queensland were the bloodiest and most brutal in colonial Australia. Many of these conflicts are now seen as acts of genocide.

The wars featured the most frequent massacres of First Nations people, the three deadliest massacres on white settlers, the most disreputable frontier police force, and the highest number of white victims to frontier violence on record in any Australian colony. Across 644 collisions, 66,680 were killed—with Aboriginal fatalities alone comprising no less than 65,180. Of these deaths, around 24,000 Aboriginal men, women and children were killed by the Native Police between 1859 and 1897.

The military force of the Queensland Government in this war was the Native Police, who operated from 1849 to the 1920s. The Native Police was a body of Aboriginal and Torres Strait Islander troopers that operated under the command of white officers. The Native Police were often recruited forcefully from far-away communities.

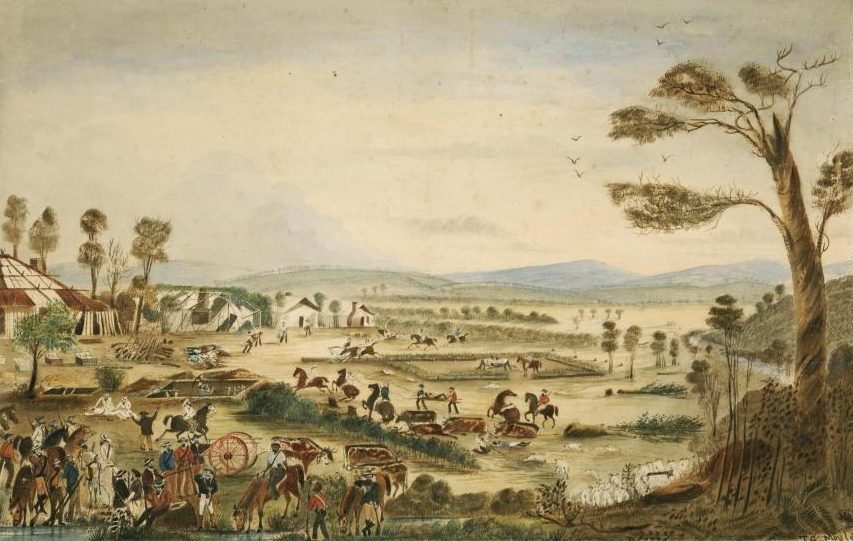
Aftermath of the 1861 Cullin-La-Ringo massacre in which 19 settlers were killed by Aboriginal people, the deadliest attack on settlers in the frontier wars

Conflict spread quickly with free settlement in 1838, with settlement rapidly expanding in a great rush to take up the surrounding land in the Darling Downs, Logan and Brisbane Valley and South Burnett onwards from 1840, in many cases leading to widespread fighting and heavy loss of life. The conflict later spread north to the Wide Bay and Burnett River and Hervey Bay region, and at one stage the settlement of Maryborough was virtually under siege.

The largest reasonably well-documented massacres in southeast Queensland were the Kilcoy and Whiteside poisonings, each of which was said to have taken up to 70 Aboriginal lives by use of a gift of flour laced with strychnine. At the Battle of One Tree Hill in September 1843, Multuggerah and his group of warriors ambushed one group of settlers, routing them and subsequently others in the skirmishes which followed, starting in retaliation for the Kilcoy poisoning.

Central Queensland was particularly hard hit during the 1860s and 1870s, several contemporary writers mention the Skull Hole, Bladensburg, or Mistake Creek massacre (Note: Not to be confused with the 1915 Mistake Creek massacre in Western Australia.) on Bladensburg Station near Winton, which in 1901 was said to have taken up to 200 Aboriginal lives. First Nations warriors killed 19 settlers during the Cullin-La-Ringo massacre on 17 October 1861. In the weeks afterwards, police, native police and civilians killed up to 370 members of the Gayiri Aboriginal people in response.

Frontier violence peaked on the northern mining frontier during the 1870s, most notably in Cook district and on the Palmer and Hodgkinson River goldfields, with heavy loss of Aboriginal lives and several well-known massacres. Raids conducted by the Kalkadoon held settlers out of Western Queensland for ten years until September 1884 when they attacked a force of settlers and native police at Battle Mountain near modern Cloncurry. The subsequent battle of Battle Mountain ended in disaster for the Kalkadoon, who suffered heavy losses. Fighting continued in North Queensland, however, with First Nations raiders attacking sheep and cattle while Native Police mounted heavy retaliatory massacres.

=== Blackbirding ===
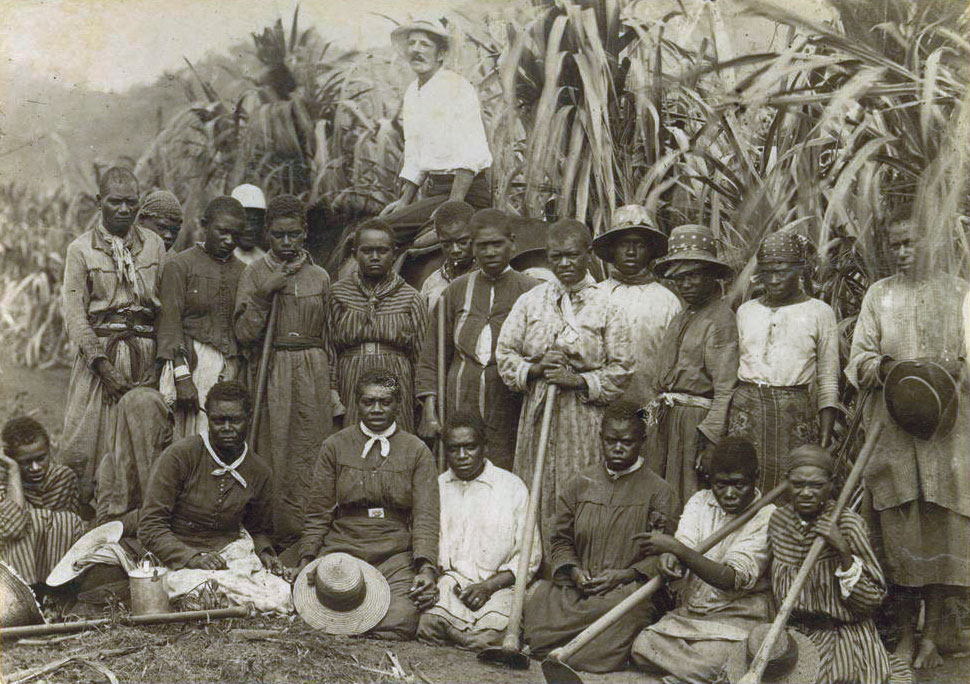
Kanaka workers in a sugar cane plantation, late 19th century

Tens of thousands of South Sea Islanders were forced, deceived or coerced into indentured servitude on Australia's agricultural plantations. The practice persisted despite slavery being outlawed in Australia and other parts of the British Empire by the Slavery Abolition Act 1833. This was known as blackbirding. The appalling conditions have been compared to slavery, or for Brooke Kroeger, slavery's 'just-as-evil twin'. This trade in what were then known as Kanakas was in operation from 1863 to 1908, a period of 45 years. Some 55,000 to 62,500 were brought to Australia, most being recruited or blackbirded from islands in Melanesia, such as the New Hebrides (now Vanuatu), the Solomon Islands and the islands around New Guinea.

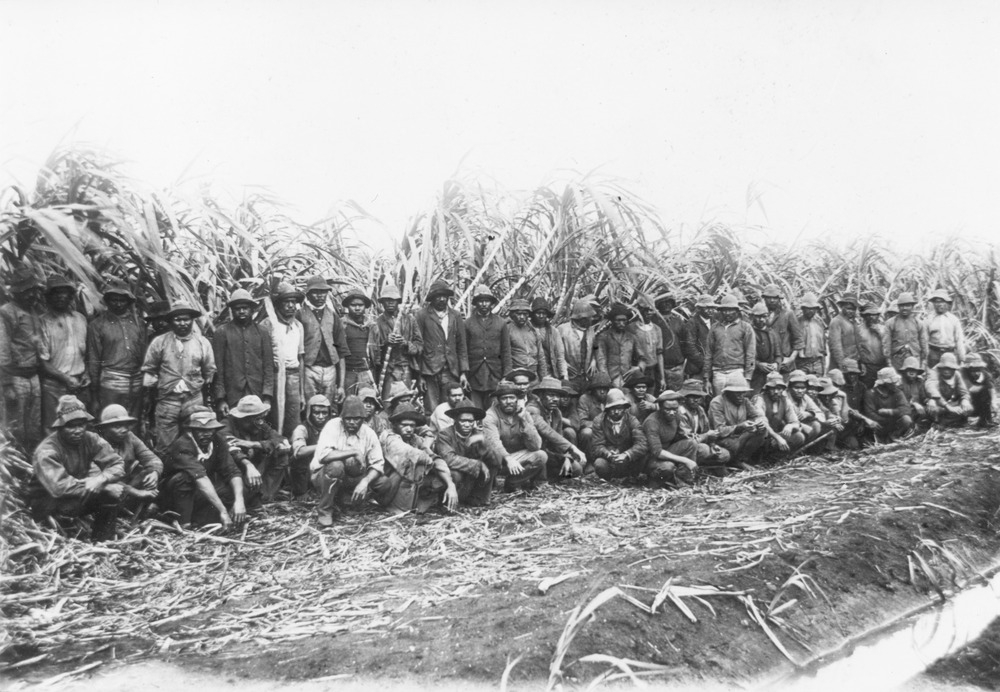
Blackbirded South Sea Islanders on a Sugarcane plantation in Queensland

The majority of those taken were male and around one quarter were under the age of sixteen. In total, approximately 15,000 South Sea Islanders (30%) died while labouring in Queensland – excluding those who died in transit or were killed in the recruitment process – mostly during three-year contracts. This is similar to the estimated 33% death rate among enslaved Africans in the first three years of arriving in America, Brazil, and the Caribbean; the conditions were often comparable to those of the Atlantic slave trade.

The trade was legally sanctioned and regulated under Queensland law, and prominent men such as Robert Towns made massive fortunes through blackbirding, helping to establish some of the major cities in Queensland today. Towns' agent claimed that blackbirded labourers were "savages who did not know the use of money" and therefore did not deserve cash wages.

Following Federation in 1901, the White Australia policy came into effect, which saw most foreign workers in Australia deported under the Pacific Island Labourers Act 1901, which saw the Pacific Islander population of the state decrease rapidly.

=== Independent governance ===
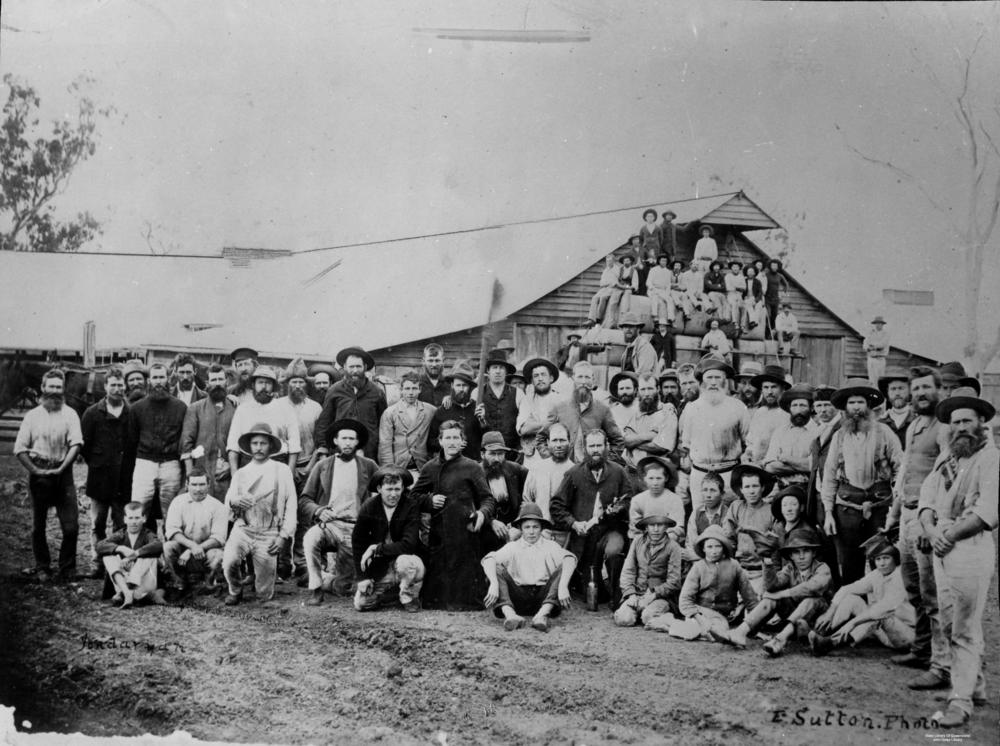
Sheep shearers and farm hands at Jondaryan Woolshed, c. 1872

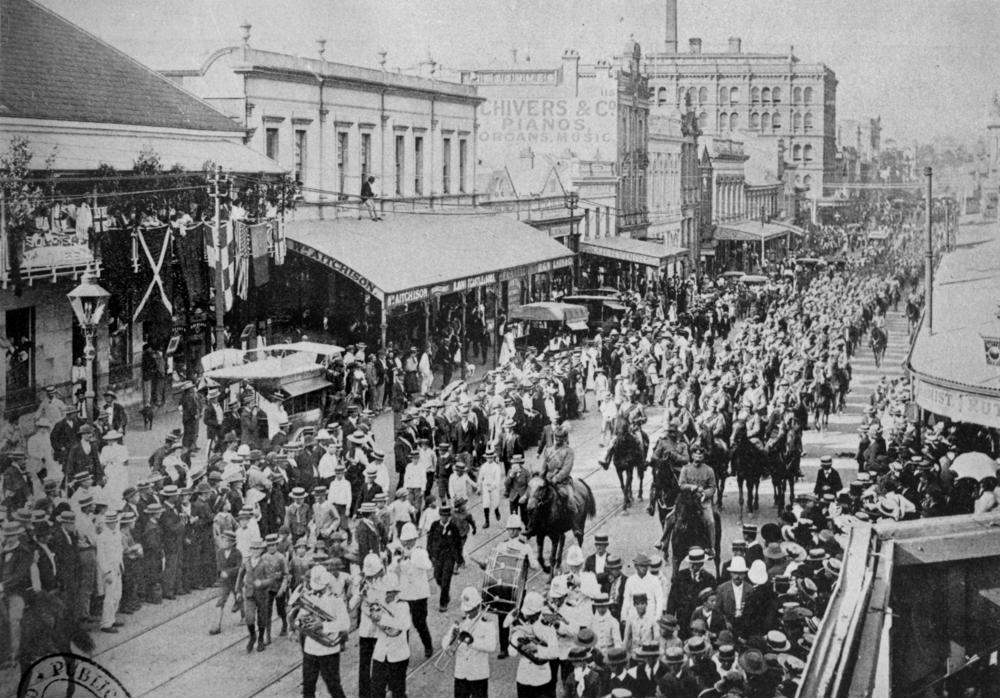
Parade of troops in Brisbane, prior to departure for the Boer War in South Africa

A public meeting was held in 1851 to consider the proposed separation of Queensland from New South Wales. On 6 June 1859, Queen Victoria signed letters patent to form the separate colony of Queensland as a self-governing Crown colony with responsible government. Brisbane was selected as the capital city. On 10 December 1859, a proclamation was read by George Bowen, the first Governor of Queensland, formally establishing Queensland as a separate colony from New South Wales. On 22 May 1860 the first Queensland election was held and Robert Herbert, Bowen's private secretary, was appointed as the first Premier of Queensland.

In 1865, the first rail line in the state opened between Ipswich and Grandchester. Queensland's economy expanded rapidly in 1867 after James Nash discovered gold on the Mary River near the town of Gympie, sparking a gold rush and saving the Colony of Queensland from near economic collapse. While still significant, they were on a much smaller scale than the gold rushes of Victoria and New South Wales.

Immigration to Australia and Queensland, in particular, began in the 1850s to support the state economy. During the period from the 1860s until the early 20th century, many labourers, known at the time as Kanakas, were brought to Queensland from neighbouring Pacific Island nations to work in the state's sugar cane fields. Some of these people had been kidnapped under a process known as blackbirding or press-ganging, and their employment conditions constituted an allegedly exploitative form of indentured labour. Italian immigrants entered the sugar cane industry from the 1890s.

During the 1890s, the six Australian colonies, including Queensland, held a series of referendums which culminated in the Federation of Australia on 1 January 1901. During this time, Queensland had a population of half a million people. Since then, Queensland has remained a federated state within Australia, and its population has significantly grown.

=== 20th century ===
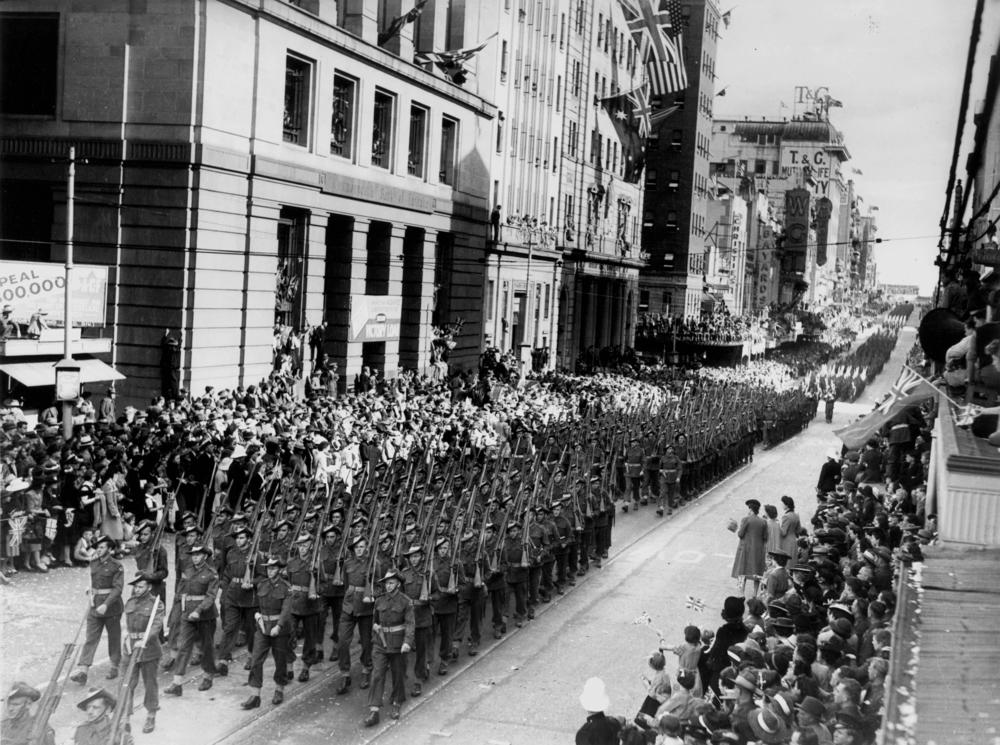
Returned World War II soldiers march in Queen Street, Brisbane, 1944

In 1905 women voted in state elections for the first time. The state's first university, the University of Queensland, was established in Brisbane in 1909. In 1911, the first alternative treatments for polio were pioneered in Queensland and remain in use across the world today.

World War I had a major impact on Queensland. Over 58,000 Queenslanders fought in World War I and over 10,000 of them died.

Australia's first major airline, Qantas (originally standing for "Queensland and Northern Territory Aerial Services"), was founded in Winton in 1920 to serve outback Queensland.

In 1922 Queensland abolished the Queensland Legislative Council, becoming the only Australian state with a unicameral parliament.

In 1935 cane toads were deliberately introduced to Queensland from Hawaii in an unsuccessful attempt to reduce the number of French's cane and greyback cane beetles that were destroying the roots of sugar cane plants, which are integral to Queensland's economy. The toads have remained an environmental pest since that time. In 1962, the first commercial production of oil in Queensland and Australia began at Moonie.

During World War II Brisbane became central to the Allied campaign when the AMP Building (now called MacArthur Central) was used as the South West Pacific headquarters for General Douglas MacArthur, chief of the Allied Pacific forces, until his headquarters were moved to Hollandia in August 1944. In 1942, during the war, Brisbane was the site of a violent clash between visiting US military personnel and Australian servicemen and civilians, which resulted in one death and hundreds of injuries. This incident became known colloquially as the Battle of Brisbane.

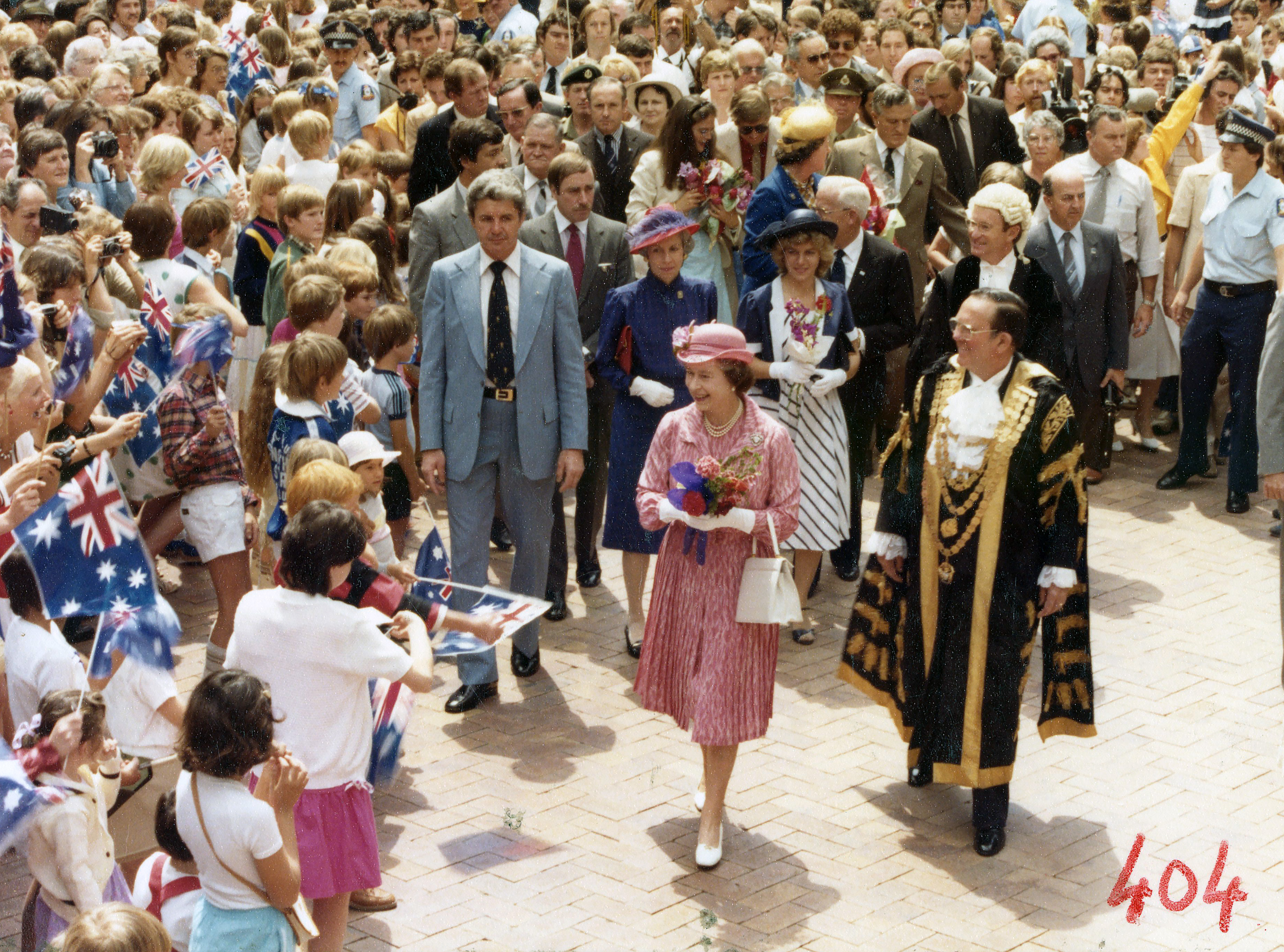
Queen Elizabeth II visited Brisbane in October 1982 for the Commonwealth Games

The end of World War II saw a wave of immigration from across Europe, with many more immigrants coming from southern and eastern Europe than in previous decades.

In the later decades of the 20th century, the humid subtropical climate—regulated by the availability of air conditioning—saw Queensland become a popular destination for migrants from interstate.

=== 21st century ===
In 2003 Queensland adopted maroon as the state's official colour. The announcement was made as a result of an informal tradition to use maroon to represent the state in association with sporting events.

After three decades of record population growth, Queensland was impacted by major floods between late 2010 and early 2011, causing extensive damage and disruption across the state.

In 2020, Queensland was impacted by the COVID-19 pandemic. Despite a low number and abrupt decline in cases from April 2020 onward, social distancing requirements were implemented from March 2020 including the closure of the state borders.

== Geography ==
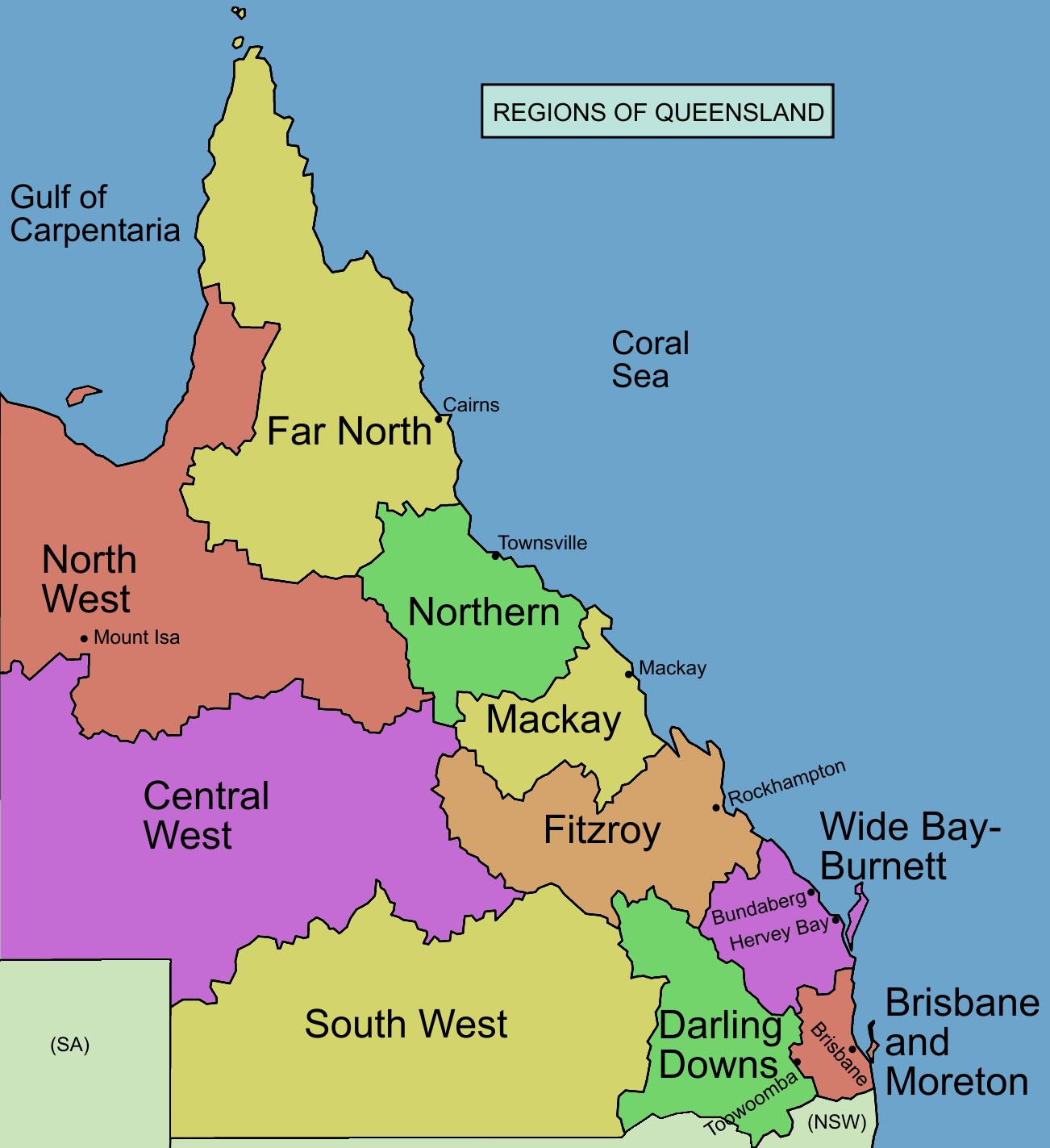
Commonly designated regions of Queensland, with Central Queensland divided into Mackay and Fitzroy subregions

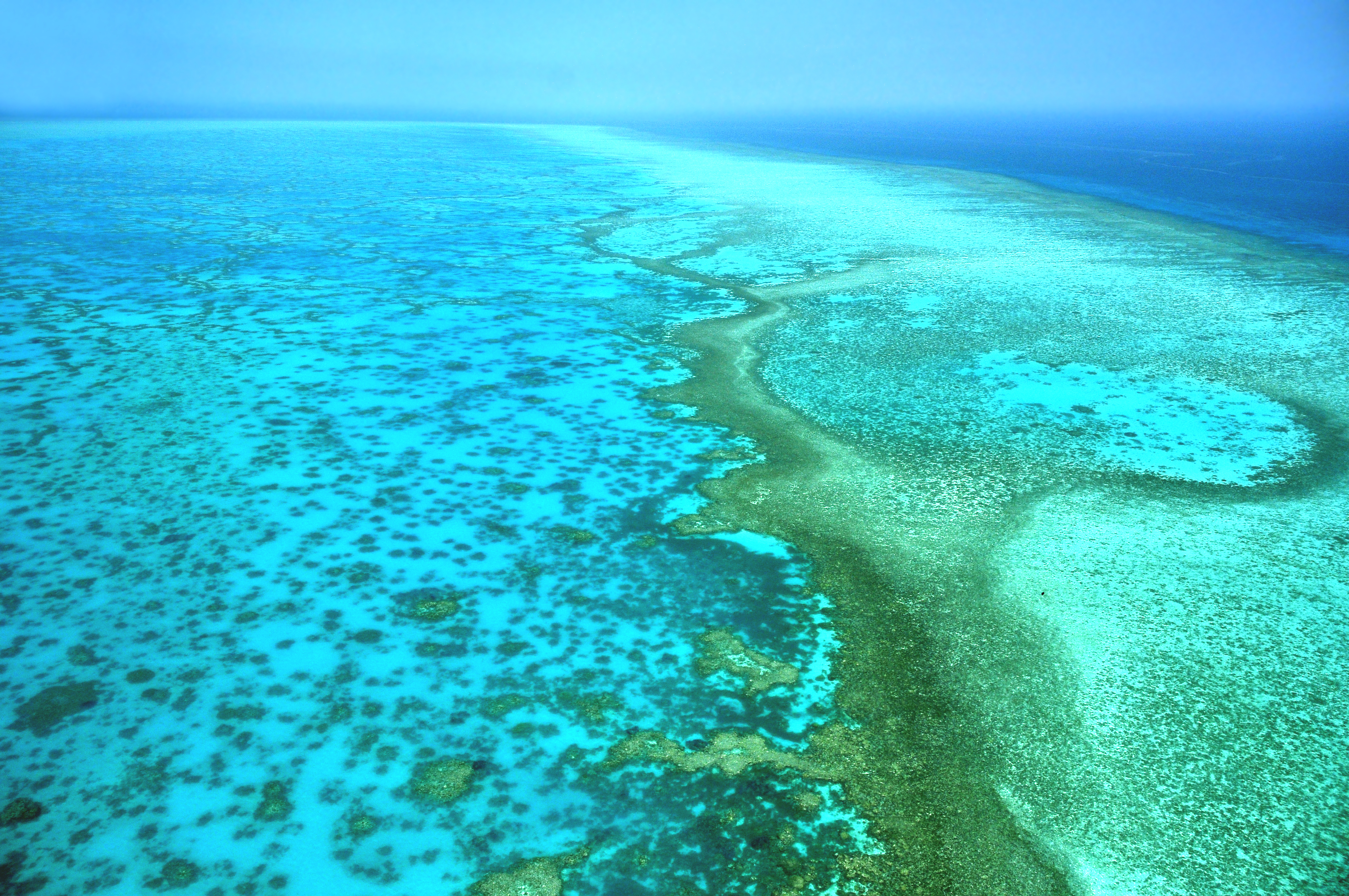
The Great Barrier Reef, which extends along most of Queensland's Coral Sea coastline

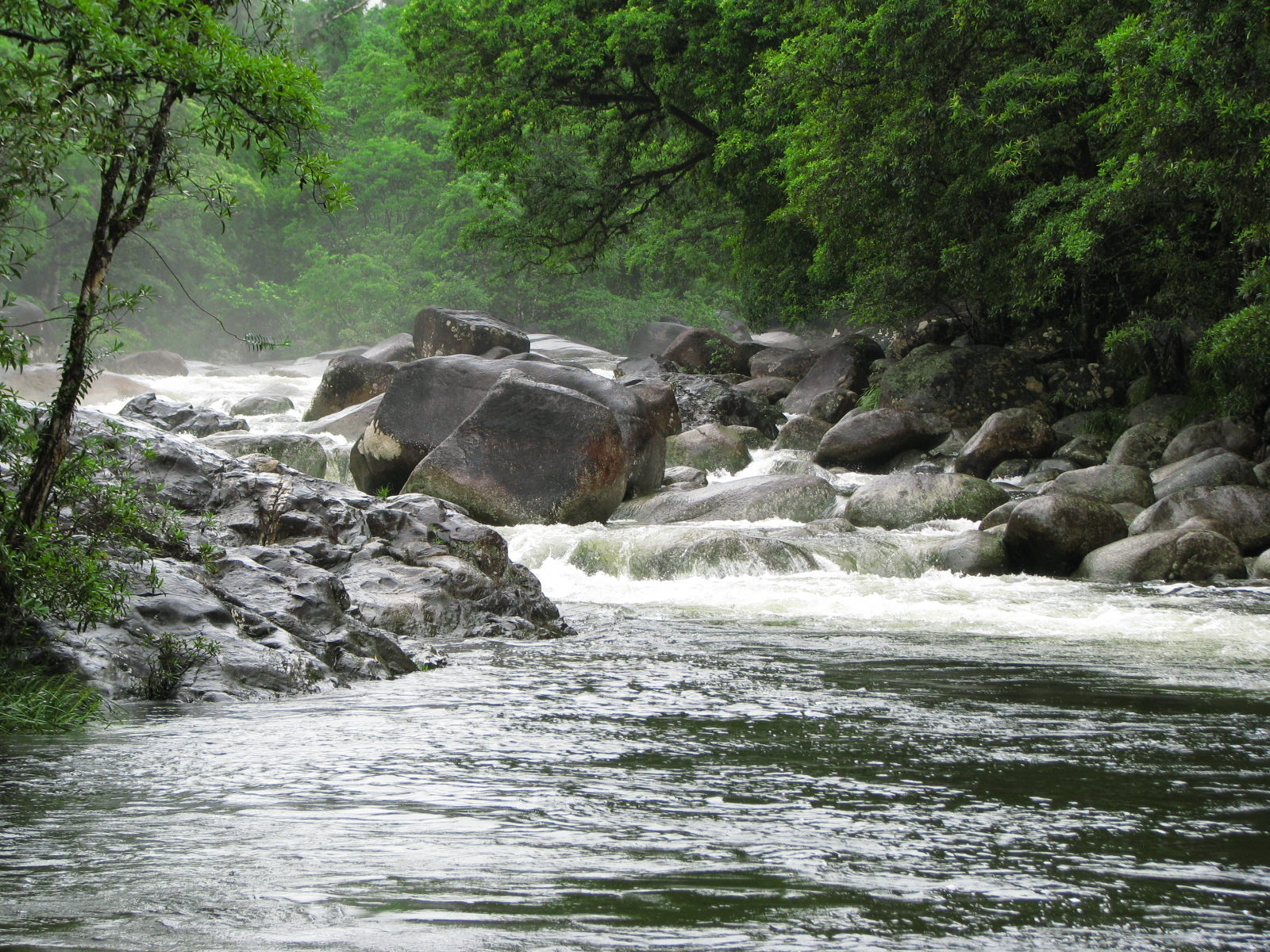
The Mossman River, flowing through the Daintree Rainforest in Far North Queensland

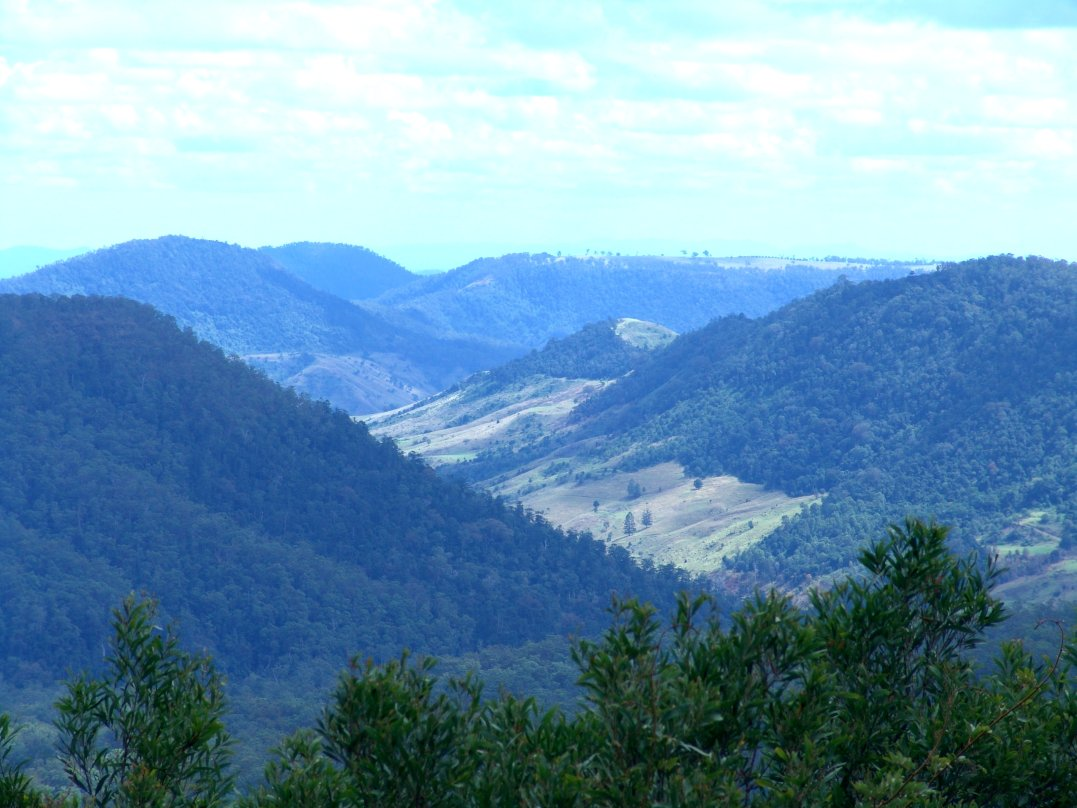
The McPherson Range at Lamington National Park in South East Queensland

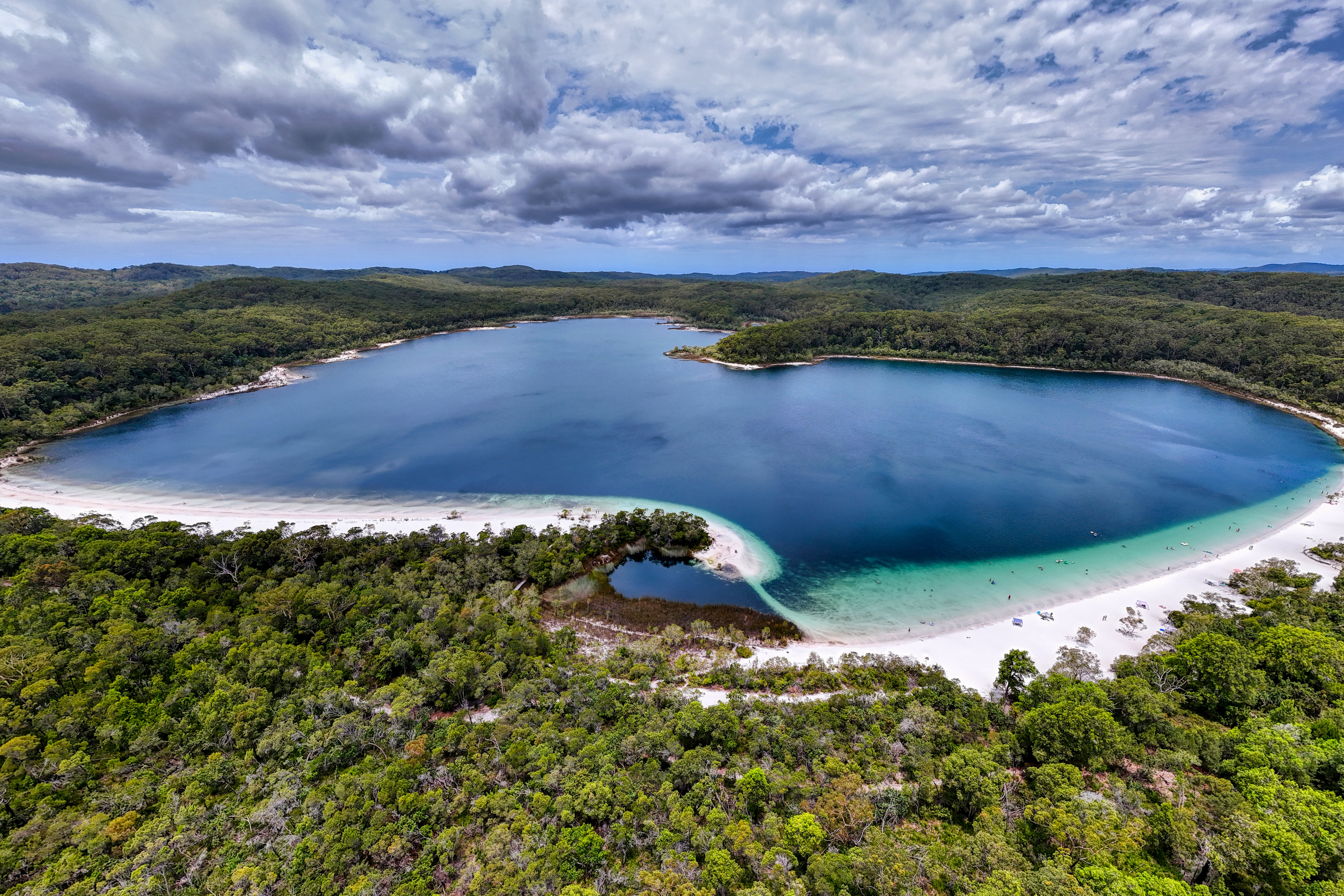
Lake McKensie, K'gari (Fraser Island)

With a total area of 1,729,742 square kilometres (715,309 square miles), Queensland is an expansive state with a diverse range of climates and geographical features. If Queensland were an independent nation, it would be the world's 16th largest in terms of area.

Queensland's eastern coastline borders the Coral Sea, an arm of the Pacific Ocean. The state is bordered by the Torres Strait to the north, with Boigu Island off the coast of New Guinea representing the northern extreme of its territory. The triangular Cape York Peninsula, which points toward New Guinea, is the northernmost part of the state's mainland. West of the peninsula's tip, northern Queensland is bordered by the Gulf of Carpentaria. To the west, Queensland is bordered by the Northern Territory, at the 138th meridian east, and to the southwest by northeastern South Australia. The state's southern border with New South Wales is constituted in the east by the watershed from Point Danger to the Dumaresq River, and the Dumaresq, Macintyre and Barwon rivers. The west of the southern border is defined by the 29th parallel south (including some minor historical encroachments) until it reaches South Australia.

Like much of eastern Australia, the Great Dividing Range runs roughly parallel with, and inland from, the coast, and areas west of the range are more arid than the humid coastal regions. The Great Barrier Reef, which is the world's largest coral reef system, runs parallel to the state's Coral Sea coast between the Torres Strait and K'gari (Fraser Island). Queensland's coastline includes the world's three largest sand islands: K'gari (Fraser Island), Moreton, and North Stradbroke.

The state contains six World Heritage-listed preservation areas: the Great Barrier Reef along the Coral Sea coast, K'gari (Fraser Island) on the Wide Bay–Burnett region's coastline, the wet tropics in Far North Queensland including the Daintree Rainforest, Lamington National Park in South East Queensland, the Riversleigh fossil sites in North West Queensland, and the Gondwana Rainforests in South East Queensland.

The state is divided into several unofficial regions which are commonly used to refer to large areas of the state's vast geography. These include:

- South East Queensland in the state's coastal extreme south-eastern corner, an urban region which includes the state's three largest cities: capital city Brisbane and popular coastal tourist destinations the Gold Coast and Sunshine Coast. In some definitions, it also includes the city of Toowoomba. South East Queensland accounts for more than 70% of the state's population.
- The Darling Downs in the state's inland southeast, which consists of fertile agricultural (particularly cattle grazing) land and in some definitions includes the city of Toowoomba. The region also includes the mountainous Granite Belt, the state's coldest region which occasionally experiences snow.
- Wide Bay–Burnett in the state's coastal southeast, to the north of the South East Queensland region. It is rich in sugar cane farms and includes the cities of Bundaberg, Hervey Bay as well as K'gari (Fraser Island), the world's largest sand island.
- Central Queensland on the state's central coastline, which is dominated by cattle farmland and coal mining. It contains the Capricorn Coast and Whitsunday Islands tourist regions, as well as the cities of Rockhampton and Mackay.
- North Queensland on the state's northern coastline, which is dominated by cattle farmland and mining and which includes the city of Townsville.
- Far North Queensland on the state's extreme northern coastline along the Cape York Peninsula, which includes tropical rainforest, the state's highest mountain, Mount Bartle Frere, the Atherton Tablelands pastoral region (dominated by sugar cane and tropical fruits), the most visited section of the Great Barrier Reef, as well as the city of Cairns.
- South West Queensland in the state's inland south-west, which is a primarily agricultural region dominated by cattle farmland, and which includes the Channel Country region of intertwining rivulets.
- Central West Queensland in the state's inland central-west, dominated by cattle farmland and which includes the city of Longreach.
- The Gulf Country (also known as North West Queensland), in the state's inland north-west along the Gulf of Carpentaria, which is dominated by savanna and mining and includes the city of Mount Isa.

=== Climate ===
Köppen climate types in Queensland

Because of its size, there is significant variation in climate across the state. There is ample rainfall along the coastline, with a monsoonal wet season in the tropical north, and humid sub-tropical conditions along the southern coastline. Low rainfall and hot humid summers are typical for the inland and west. Elevated areas in the south-eastern inland can experience temperatures well below freezing in mid-winter providing frost and, rarely, snowfall. The climate of the coastal regions is influenced by warm ocean waters, keeping the region free from extremes of temperature and providing moisture for rainfall.

There are six predominant climatic zones in Queensland, based on temperature and humidity:

- Hot humid summer, warm humid winter (far north and coastal): Cairns, Innisfail
- Hot humid summer, warm dry winter (north and coastal): Townsville, Mackay
- Hot humid summer, mild dry winter (coastal elevated areas and coastal south-east): Brisbane, Bundaberg, Rockhampton
- Hot dry summer, mild dry winter (central inland and north-west): Mt Isa, Emerald, Longreach
- Hot dry summer, cool dry winter (southern inland): Roma, Charleville, Goondiwindi
- Warm humid summer, cold dry winter (elevated south-eastern areas): Toowoomba, Warwick, Stanthorpe

The annual average climatic statistics for selected Queensland cities are shown below:

City	Mean daily min. temp	Mean daily max. temp	No. clear days	Rainfall
Brisbane	15.7 °C (60.3 °F)	25.5 °C (77.9 °F)	113.1	1,149.1 mm (45.24 in)
Mackay	19.0 °C (66.2 °F)	26.4 °C (79.5 °F)	123.0	1,570.7 mm (61.84 in)
Cairns	21.0 °C (69.8 °F)	29.2 °C (84.6 °F)	89.7	1,982.2 mm (78.04 in)
Townsville	19.8 °C (67.6 °F)	28.9 °C (84.0 °F)	120.9	1,136.7 mm (44.75 in)

The coastal far north of the state is the wettest region in Australia, with Mount Bellenden Ker, south of Cairns, holding many Australian rainfall records with its annual average rainfall of over 8 metres (26 ft). Snow is rare in Queensland, although it does fall with some regularity along the far southern border with New South Wales, predominantly in the Stanthorpe district although on rare occasions further north and west. The most northerly snow ever recorded in Australia occurred near Mackay; however, this was exceptional.

Natural disasters are often a threat in Queensland: severe tropical cyclones can impact the central and northern coastlines and cause severe damage, with recent examples including Larry, Yasi, Ita and Debbie. Flooding from rain-bearing systems can also be severe and can occur anywhere in Queensland. One of the deadliest and most damaging floods in the history of the state occurred in early 2011. Severe springtime thunderstorms generally affect the south-east and inland of the state and can bring damaging winds, torrential rain, large hail and even tornadoes. The strongest tornado ever recorded in Australia occurred in Queensland near Bundaberg in November 1992. Droughts and bushfires can also occur; however, the latter are generally less severe than those that occur in southern states.

The highest official maximum temperature recorded in the state was 49.5 °C (121.1 °F) at Birdsville Police Station on 24 December 1972. The lowest recorded minimum temperature is −10.6 °C (12.9 °F) at Stanthorpe on 23 June 1961 and at The Hermitage (near Warwick) on 12 July 1965.

Climate data for Queensland
Month	Jan	Feb	Mar	Apr	May	Jun	Jul	Aug	Sep	Oct	Nov	Dec	Year
Record high °C (°F)	49.0 (120.2)	47.2 (117.0)	46.7 (116.1)	41.7 (107.1)	39.3 (102.7)	36.0 (96.8)	36.1 (97.0)	38.5 (101.3)	42.8 (109.0)	46.1 (115.0)	48.7 (119.7)	49.5 (121.1)	49.5 (121.1)
Record low °C (°F)	5.4 (41.7)	3.3 (37.9)	−0.2 (31.6)	−3.5 (25.7)	−6.9 (19.6)	−10.6 (12.9)	−10.6 (12.9)	−9.4 (15.1)	−5.6 (21.9)	−3.6 (25.5)	0.0 (32.0)	2.2 (36.0)	−10.6 (12.9)
Source 1: Bureau of Meteorology
Source 2: Bureau of Meteorology

== Demographics ==
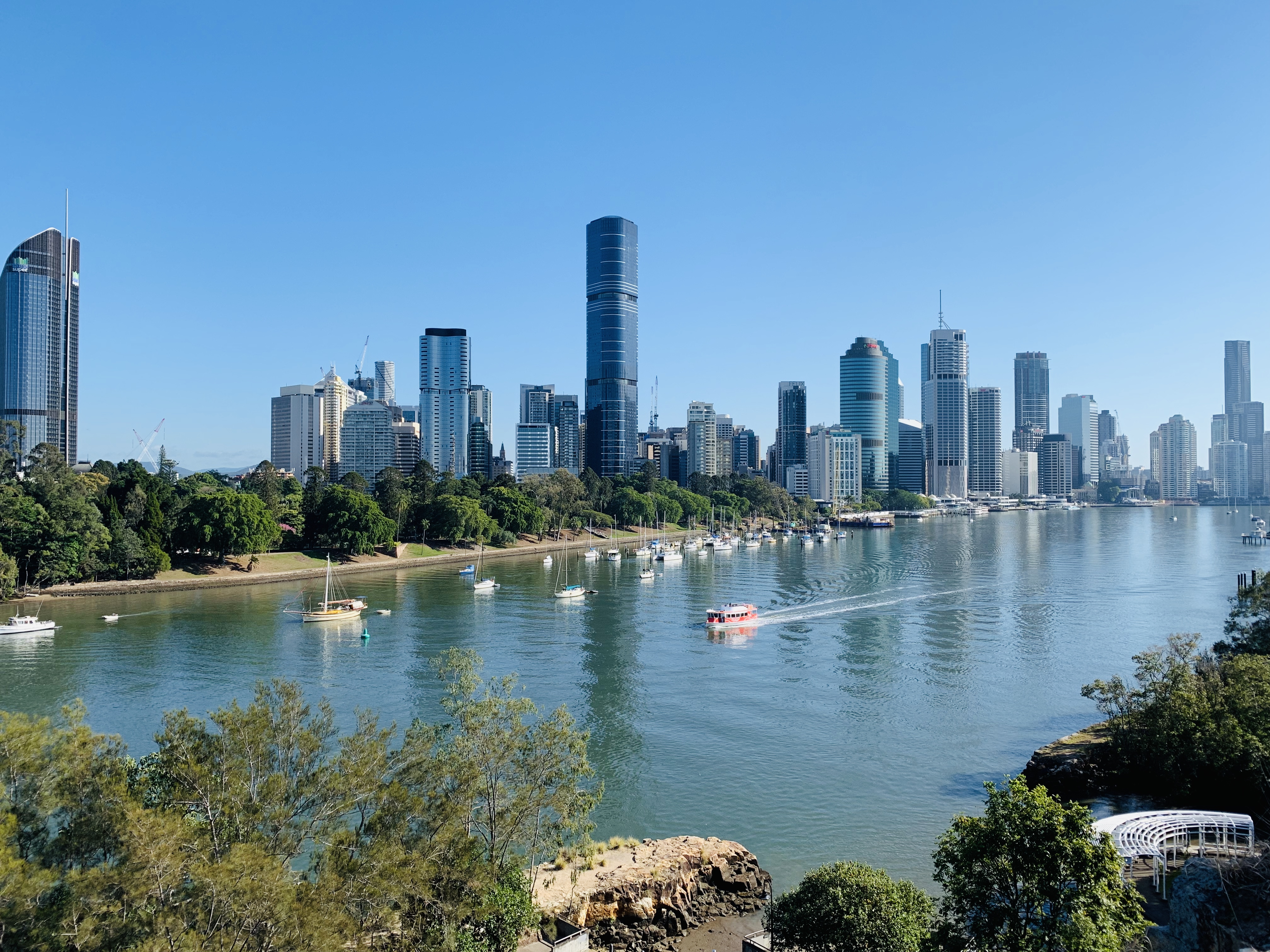
Brisbane, capital and most populous city of Queensland

Historical populations

Queensland (Note: Pre-1971 figures may not include the Indigenous population.)
Year	Pop.	±%
1826	160	—
1836	400	+150.0%
1846	2,258	+464.5%
1856	18,544	+721.3%
1864	73,578	+296.8%
1876	182,185	+147.6%
1886	332,311	+82.4%
1891	400,395	+20.5%
1906	538,973	+34.6%
1916	677,026	+25.6%
1926	862,486	+27.4%
1936	982,978	+14.0%
1946	1,096,831	+11.6%
1956	1,381,591	+26.0%
1966	1,674,324	+21.2%
1976	2,092,375	+25.0%
1986	2,624,595	+25.4%
1996	3,338,690	+27.2%
2006	4,090,908	+22.5%
2016	4,844,500	+18.4%

In March 2026, Queensland had an estimated population of 5,739,500. Approximately half of the state's population lives in Brisbane, and over 70% live in South East Queensland. Nonetheless, Queensland is the second most decentralised state in Australia after Tasmania. Since the 1980s, Queensland has consistently been the fastest-growing state in Australia, as it receives high levels of both international immigration and migration from interstate. There have however been short periods where Victoria and Western Australia have grown faster.

=== Cities ===
Ten of Australia's thirty largest cities are located in Queensland. In 2019, the largest cities in the state by population of their Greater Capital City Statistical Area or Significant Urban Area (metropolitan areas) as defined by the Australian Bureau of Statistics were:

- Brisbane: 2,514,184
- Gold Coast–Tweed Heads: 693,671
- Sunshine Coast: 341,069
- Townsville: 181,668
- Cairns: 153,951
- Toowoomba: 138,223
- Mackay: 80,264
- Rockhampton: 79,081
- Bundaberg: 71,309
- Hervey Bay: 55,345
- Gladstone–Tannum Sands: 45,631

=== Ancestry and immigration ===
Country of Birth (2016)
Birthplace (Note: In accordance with the Australian Bureau of Statistics source, England, Scotland, Mainland China and the Special Administrative Regions of Hong Kong and Macau are listed separately)	Population
Australia	3,343,657
New Zealand	201,206
England	180,775
India	49,145
Mainland China	47,114
South Africa	40,131
Philippines	39,661
Scotland	21,882
Germany	20,387
Vietnam	19,544
South Korea	18,327
United States	17,053
Papua New Guinea	16,120
Taiwan	15,592

Early settlers during the 19th century were largely English, Irish, Scottish and German, while there was a wave of immigration from southern and eastern Europe (most notably Italy) in the decades following the second world war. In the 21st century, Asia (most notably China and India) has been the primary source of immigration.

At the 2016 census, the most commonly nominated ancestries were: (Note: As a percentage of 4,348,289 persons who nominated their ancestry at the 2016 census.)

- English (41.3%)
- Australian (37.9%) (Note: The Australian Bureau of Statistics has stated that most who nominate "Australian" as their ancestry are part of the Anglo-Celtic group.)
- Irish (13%)
- Scottish (11.2%)
- German (6.8%)
- Indigenous (4%) (Note: Of any ancestry. Includes those identifying as Aboriginal Australians or Torres Strait Islanders. Indigenous identification is separate from the ancestry question on the Australian Census and persons identifying as Aboriginal or Torres Strait Islander may identify any ancestry.)
- Chinese (3.1%)
- Italian (3%)
- Indian (1.7%)
- Dutch (1.6%)
- New Zealander (1.6%)
- Maori (1.2%)
- Filipino (1.2%)

The 2016 census showed that 28.9% of Queensland's inhabitants were born overseas. Only 54.8% of inhabitants had both parents born in Australia, with the next most common birthplaces being New Zealand, England, India, Mainland China and South Africa. Brisbane has the 26th largest immigrant population among world metropolitan areas.

4% of the population, or 186,482 people, identified as Indigenous Australians (Aboriginal Australians and Torres Strait Islanders) in 2016. (Note: Of any ancestry. Includes those identifying as Aboriginal Australians or Torres Strait Islanders. Indigenous identification is separate from the ancestry question on the Australian Census and persons identifying as Aboriginal or Torres Strait Islander may identify any ancestry.)

=== Language ===
At the 2016 census, 81.2% of inhabitants spoke only English at home, with the next most common languages being Mandarin (1.5%), Vietnamese (0.6%), Cantonese (0.5%), Spanish (0.4%) and Italian (0.4%).

At the 2021 census, 80.5% of inhabitants spoke only English at home, with the next most common languages being Mandarin (1.6%), Vietnamese (0.6%), Punjabi (0.6%) and Spanish (0.6%).

=== Religion ===
At the 2016 census, the most commonly cited religious affiliations were 'No religion' (29.2%), Catholicism (21.7%) and Anglicanism (15.3%). In the 2016 Census the majority of Queenslanders were identified as Christian, most of which were of various Protestant denominations.

According to the 2021 census, 45.7% of the population follows Christianity, and 41.2% identified as having No religion About 5% of people are affiliated with a non-Christian religion, mainly Buddhism (1.4%), Hinduism (1.3%) and Islam (1.2%). The 2021 census found that Protestants of various denominations outnumbered Catholics in Queensland.

=== Education ===
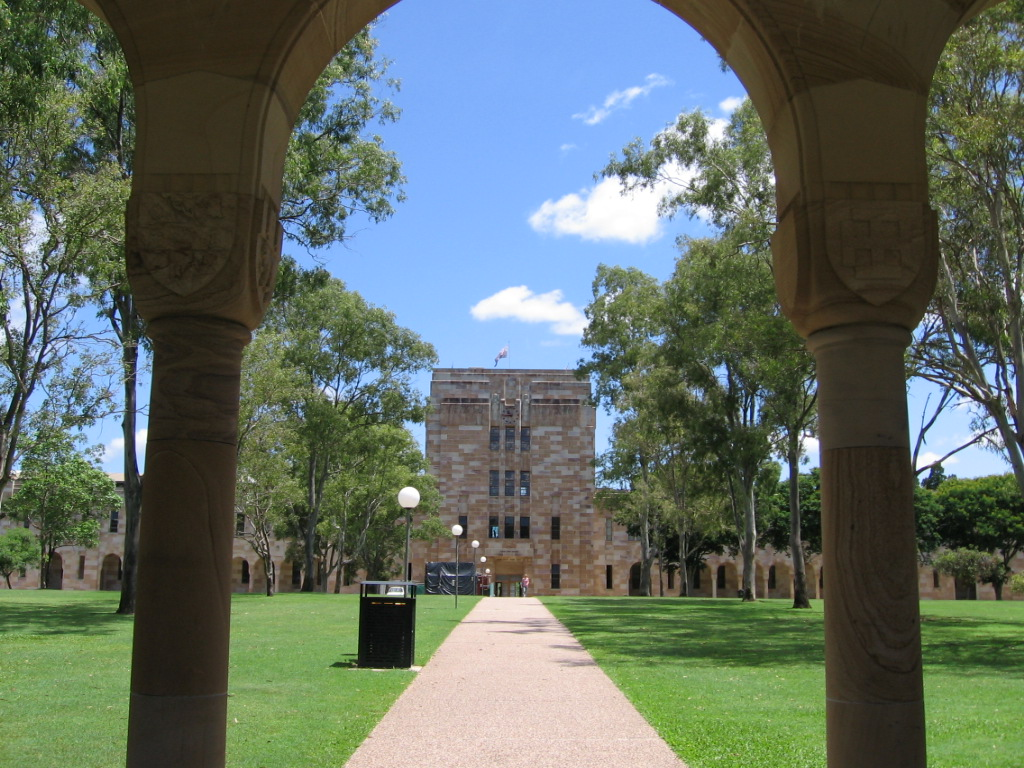
The Great Court at the University of Queensland in Brisbane, Queensland's oldest university

Queensland is home to numerous universities. The state's oldest university, the University of Queensland, was established in 1909 and frequently ranks among the world's top 50. Other major universities include Queensland University of Technology, Griffith University, the University of Southern Queensland, the University of the Sunshine Coast, James Cook University (which was the state's first university outside of South East Queensland), Central Queensland University and Bond University (which was Australia's first private university).

International education is an important industry, with 134,312 international students enrolled in the state in 2018, largely focused on Brisbane. Most of the state's international students are from Asia.

At the primary and secondary levels, Queensland is home to numerous state and private schools.

Queensland has a public library system which is managed by the State Library of Queensland. Some university libraries are also open to the public.

== Economy ==
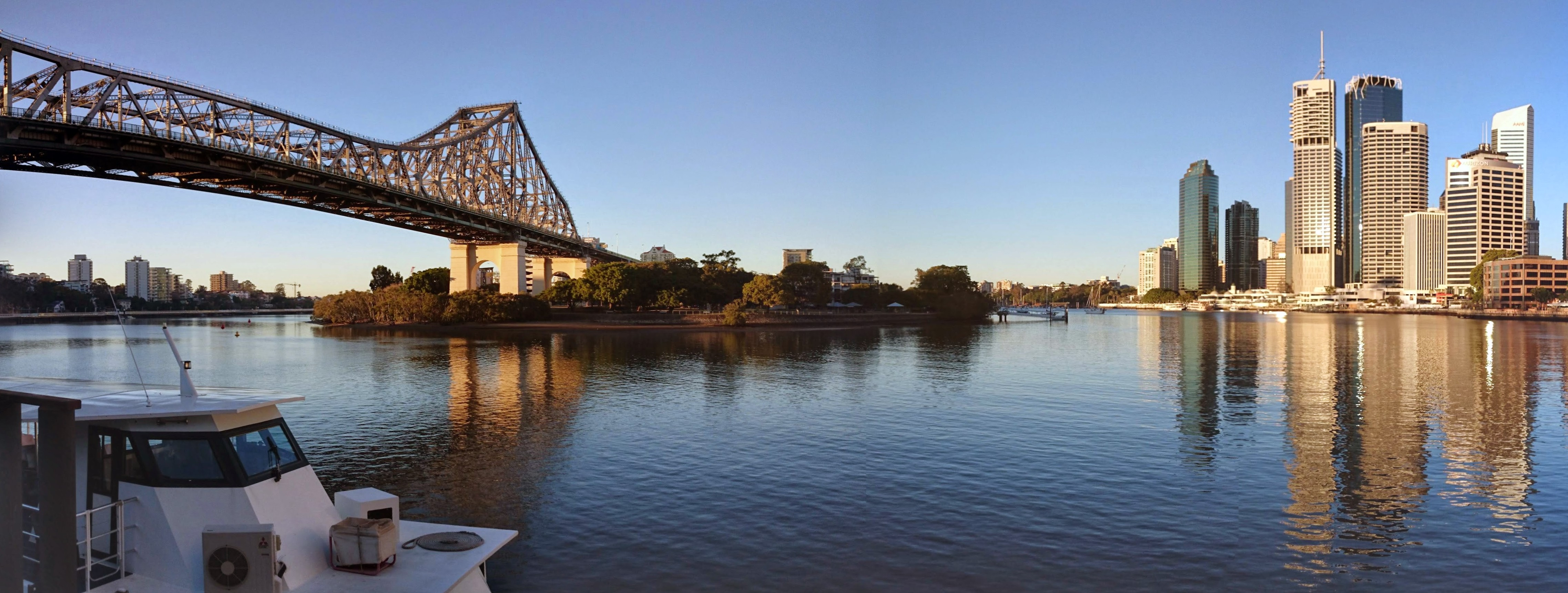
Skyline of the Brisbane central business district. Brisbane is a global city and the state's largest economic hub.

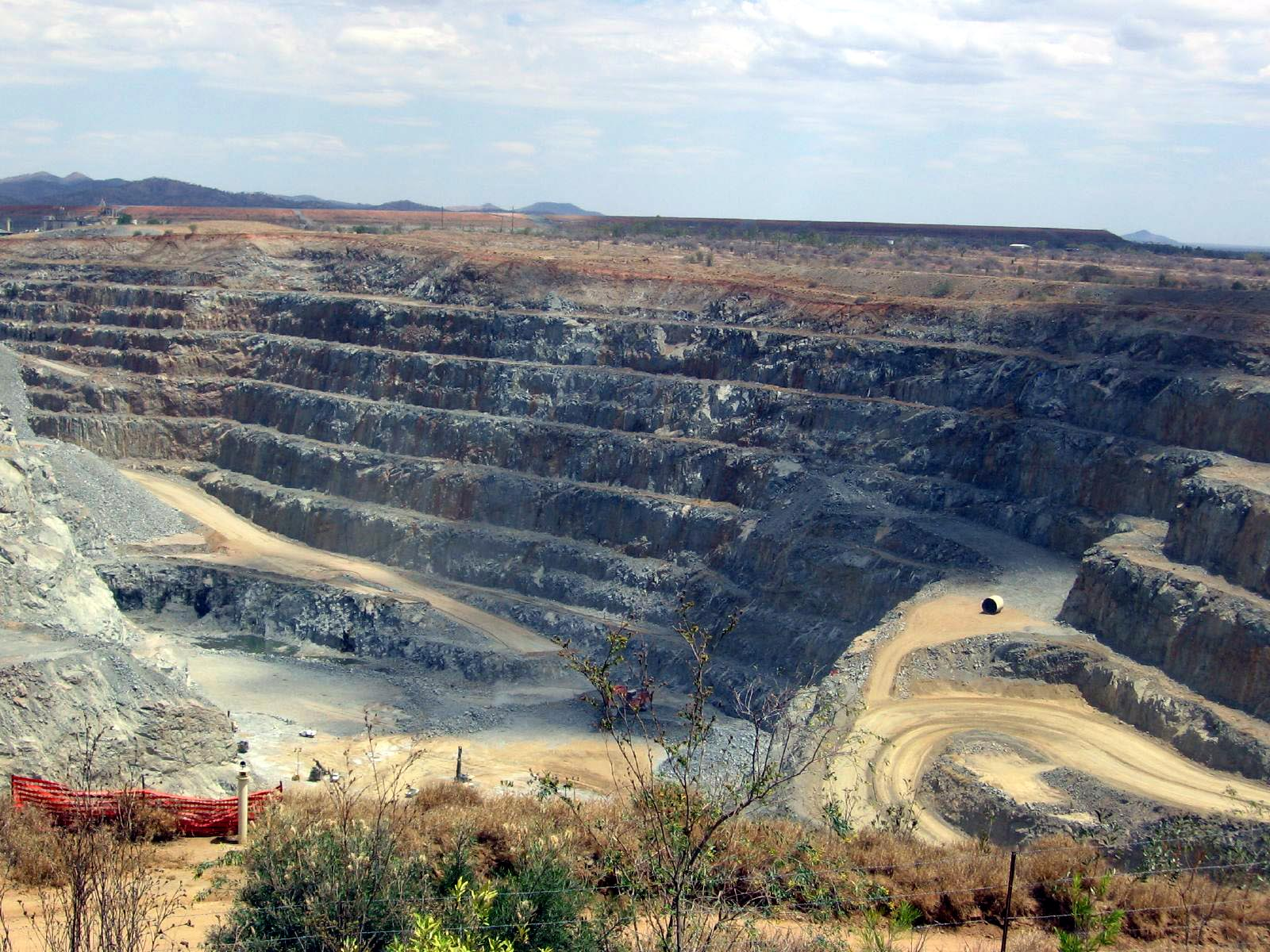
Gold mine at Ravenswood in North Queensland. Mining is one of the state's major industries

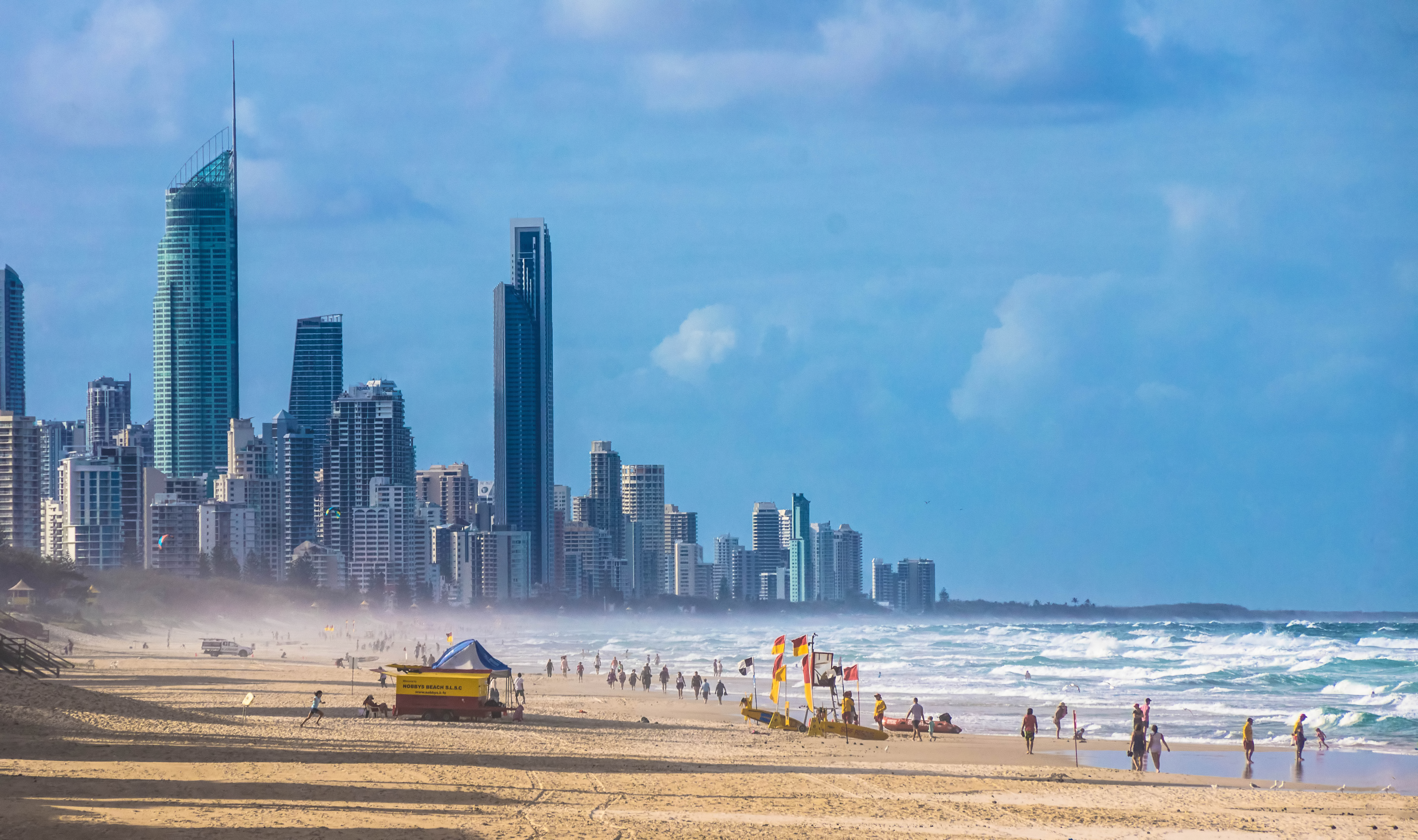
The Gold Coast, Queensland's second-largest city and a major tourist destination

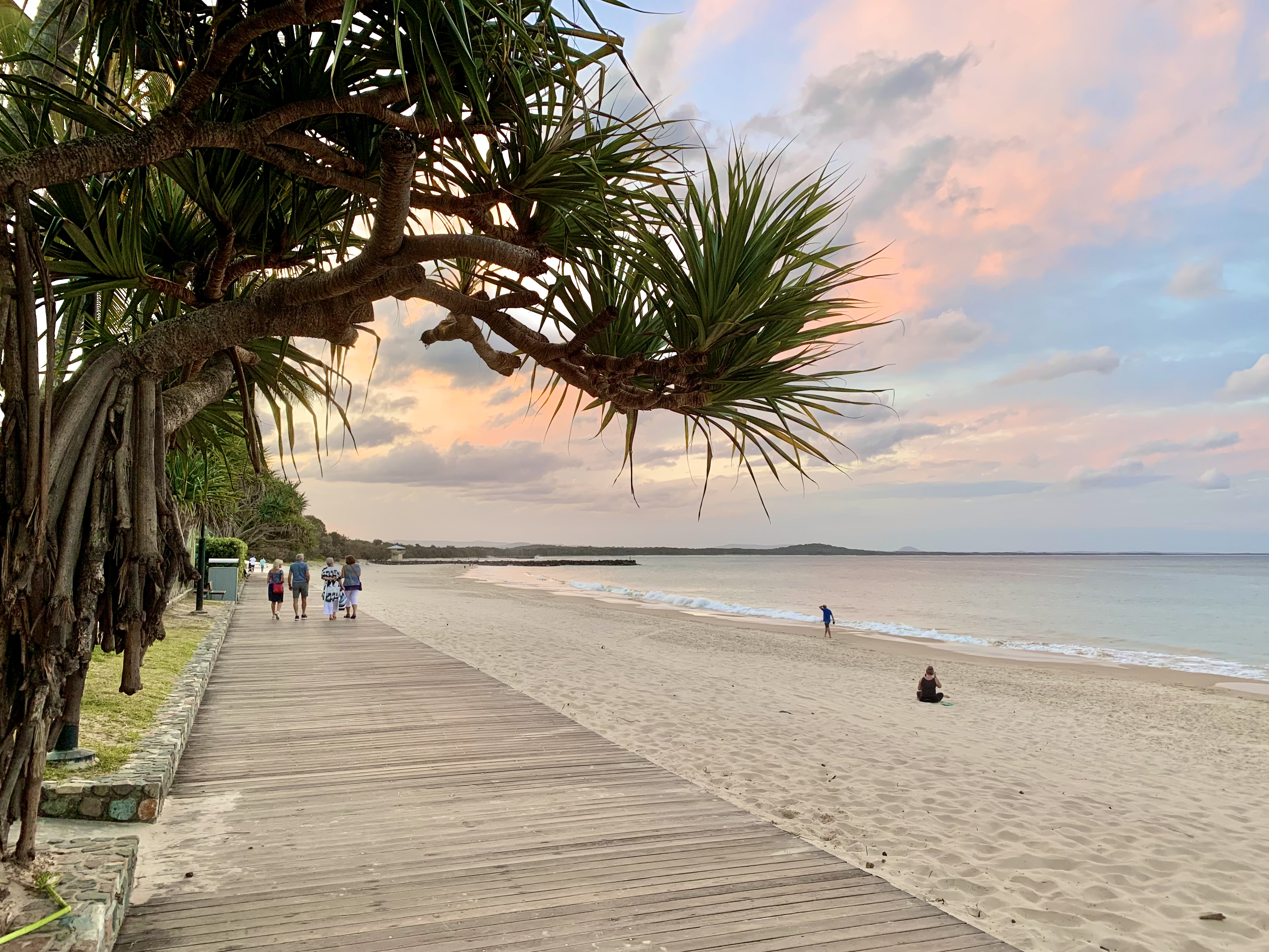
Noosa Heads on the Sunshine Coast, Queensland's third largest city and a major tourist destination

In 2019, Queensland had a gross state product of A$357,044 million, the third-highest in the nation after New South Wales and Victoria. The construction of sea ports and railways along Queensland's coast in the 19th century set up the foundations for the state's export-oriented mining and agricultural sectors. Since the 1980s, a sizeable influx of interstate and overseas migrants, large amounts of federal government investment, increased mining of vast mineral deposits and an expanding aerospace sector have contributed to the state's economic growth.

Primary industries include bananas, pineapples, peanuts, a wide variety of other tropical and temperate fruit and vegetables, grain crops, wineries, cattle raising, cotton, sugarcane, and wool. The mining industry includes bauxite, coal, silver, lead, zinc, gold and copper.

Secondary industries are mostly further processing of the above-mentioned primary produce. For example, bauxite is shipped by sea from Weipa and converted to alumina at Gladstone. There is also copper refining and the refining of sugar cane to sugar at a number of mills along the eastern coastline.

Major tertiary industries are retail, tourism, and international education. In 2018, there were 134,312 international students enrolled in the state, largely focused on Brisbane. Most of the state's international students are from Asia.

Brisbane is categorised as a global city, and is among Asia-Pacific cities with largest GDPs. It has strengths in mining, banking, insurance, transportation, information technology, real estate and food. Some of the largest companies headquartered in Brisbane, all among Australia's largest, include Suncorp Group, Virgin Australia, Aurizon, Bank of Queensland, Flight Centre, CUA, Sunsuper, QSuper, Domino's Pizza Enterprises, Star Entertainment Group, ALS, TechnologyOne, NEXTDC, Super Retail Group, New Hope Coal, Jumbo Interactive, National Storage, Collins Foods and Boeing Australia.

=== Tourism ===
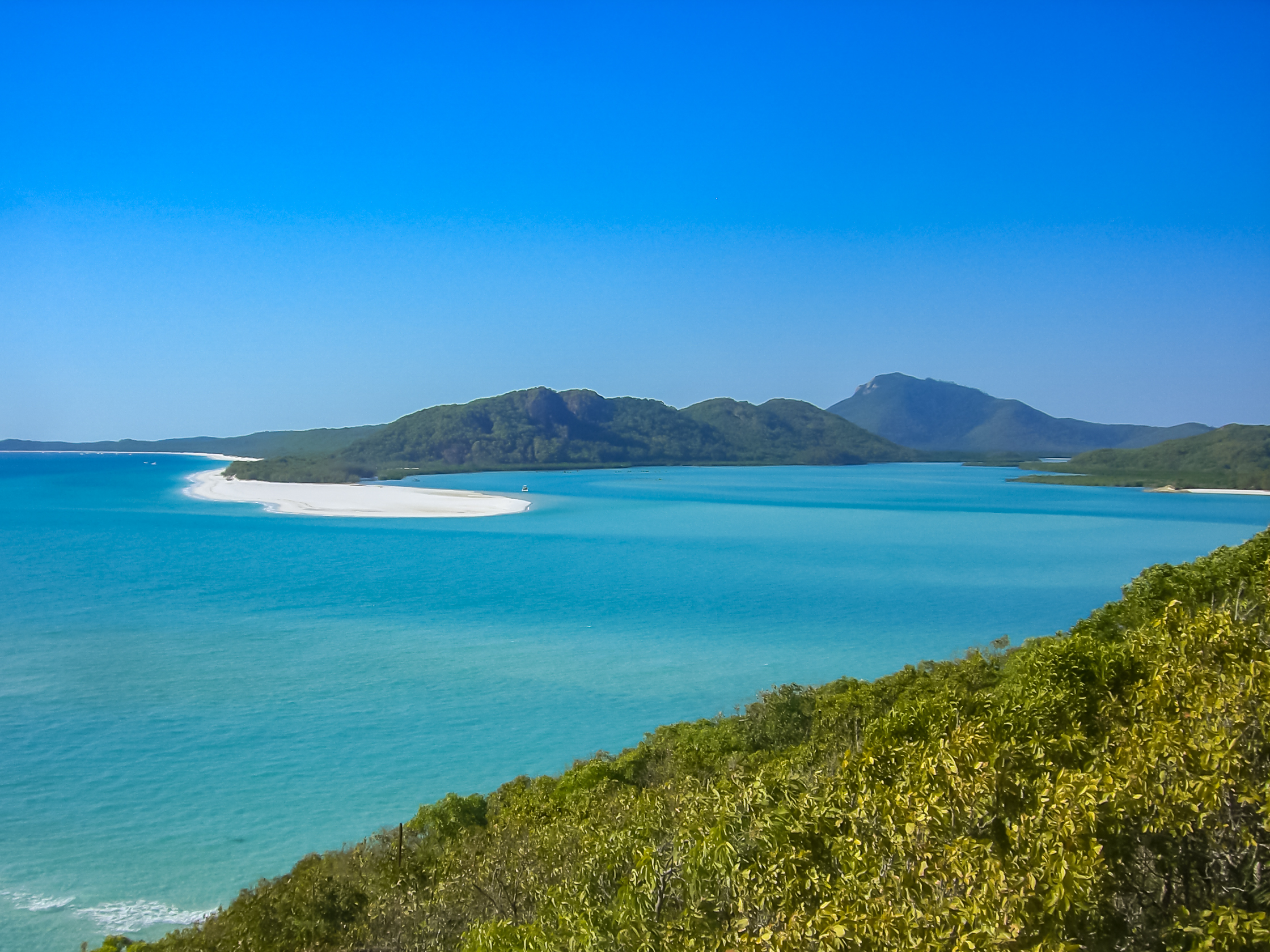
Hill Inlet at the Whitsunday Islands.

As a result of its varied landscapes, warm climate, and abundant natural environment, tourism is Queensland's leading tertiary industry with millions of interstate and international visitors visiting the state each year. The industry generates $8.8 billion annually, accounting for 4.5% of Queensland's Gross State Product. It has an annual export of $4.0 billion annually. The sector directly employs about 5.7% of Queensland citizens. Accommodation in Queensland caters for nearly 22% of the total expenditure, followed by restaurants/meals (15%), airfares (11%), fuel (11%) and shopping/gifts (11%).

The most visited tourist destinations of Queensland include Brisbane (including Moreton and South Stradbroke islands and the Gold Coast) as well as the Sunshine Coast, the Great Barrier Reef, Cairns, Port Douglas, the Daintree Rainforest, K'gari and the Whitsunday Islands.

Brisbane is the third most popular destination in Australia following Sydney and Melbourne. Major attractions in its metropolitan area include South Bank Parklands, the Queensland Cultural Centre (including the Queensland Museum, Queensland Art Gallery, Gallery of Modern Art, Queensland Performing Arts Centre and State Library of Queensland), City Hall, the Story Bridge, the Howard Smith Wharves, ANZAC Square, St John's Cathedral, Fortitude Valley (including James Street and Chinatown), West End, the Teneriffe woolstores precinct, the Brisbane River and its Riverwalk network, the City Botanic Gardens, Roma Street Parkland, New Farm Park (including the Brisbane Powerhouse), the Kangaroo Point Cliffs and park, the Lone Pine Koala Sanctuary, the Mount Coot-tha Reserve (including Mount Coot-tha Lookout and Mount Coot-tha Botanic Gardens), the D'Aguilar Range and National Park, as well as Moreton Bay (including Moreton, North Stradbroke and Bribie islands, and coastal suburbs such as Shorncliffe, Wynnum and those on the Redcliffe Peninsula).

The Gold Coast is home to numerous popular surf beaches such as those at Surfers Paradise and Burleigh Heads. It also includes the largest concentration of amusement parks in Australia, including Dreamworld, Movie World, Sea World, Wet 'n' Wild and WhiteWater World, as well as the Currumbin Wildlife Sanctuary. The Gold Coast's hinterland includes Lamington National Park in the McPherson Range.

The Sunshine Coast includes popular surfing and beach destinations including Noosa Heads and Mooloolaba. It is also home to UnderWater World and Steve Irwin's Australia Zoo. Its hinterland includes the Glass House Mountains National Park.

Cairns is renowned as the gateway to the Great Barrier Reef, Far North Queensland (including Port Douglas) and the Daintree Rainforest. The Whitsunday Islands off the coast of North Queensland are a popular tourist destinations for their resort facilities and access to the Great Barrier Reef.

== Politics and government ==
One of the six founding states of Australia, Queensland has been a federated state subject to the Australian Constitution since 1 January 1901. It may legislate on all matters not ceded in the Australian Constitution to the federal government. It is a parliamentary constitutional monarchy. The Constitution of Queensland sets out the operation of the state's government. The state's constitution contains several entrenched provisions which cannot be changed in the absence of a referendum. There is also a statutory charter of rights, the Queensland Human Rights Act 2019. Queensland's system of government is influenced by the Westminster system and Australia's federal system of government.

The government power can be divided into three groups:

- Legislature: the unicameral Parliament of Queensland, comprising the Legislative Assembly and the Monarch (represented by the Governor);
- Executive: the Queensland Government, which consists of the Executive Council of Queensland, which formalises decisions of the Cabinet of Queensland, which is composed of the Premier and other ministers of state appointed by the Governor on the advice of the premier;
- Judiciary: the Supreme Court and other state courts, whose judges are appointed by the Governor on the advice of Parliament.

Executive authority is nominally vested in the Governor of Queensland (currently Jeannette Young) who represents and is appointed by the Monarch (currently Charles III) on the advice of the Premier of Queensland. The Premier, who is the state's Head of government, along with the Cabinet of Queensland (whose decisions are formalised by the Executive Council), exercise executive authority in practice. The Premier is appointed by the Governor and must have support of the Legislative Assembly of Queensland. The Premier is in practice a leading member of the Legislative Assembly and parliamentary leader of his or her political party, or coalition of parties, and members of the Cabinet will be drawn from the same party or coalition. The current Premier and Deputy Premier are David Crisafulli and Jarrod Bleijie of the Liberal National Party respectively. Government House at Paddington in Brisbane is the seat of the Governor, having replaced Old Government House at Gardens Point in Brisbane's CBD in the early 20th century. The executive branch is simply referred to as the Queensland Government.

Legislative authority is exercised by the Queensland Parliament which uniquely for Australian states is unicameral, containing only one house, the Legislative Assembly. The Parliament was bicameral until 1922 when the Legislative Council was abolished by the Labor "suicide squad", so called because they were appointed for the purpose of voting to abolish their own offices. Bills receive royal assent from the Governor before being passed into law. The Parliament's seat is at Parliament House at Gardens Point in Brisbane's CBD. Members of the Legislative Assembly represent 93 electoral districts. Elections in Queensland are held at the end of each fixed four-year parliamentary term and are determined by full preferential voting.

The state's judiciary consists of the Supreme Court of Queensland and the District Court of Queensland, established by the Queensland Constitution, as well as the Magistrates Court of Queensland and other courts and tribunals established by legislation. Cases may be appealed to the High Court of Australia. As with all Australian states and territories, Queensland has a common law legal system. The Supreme and District courts are headquartered at the Queen Elizabeth II Courts of Law in Brisbane's CBD.

The state's politics are traditionally regarded as being conservative relative to other states. Historically, the lack of an upper house, the "Bjelkemander" (a malapportion favouring rural electoral districts) has meant that Queensland had a long tradition of domination by strong-willed, populist premiers, often accused of authoritarian tendencies, holding office for long periods. This tendency was exemplified by the government of the state's longest-serving Premier Joh Bjelke-Petersen.

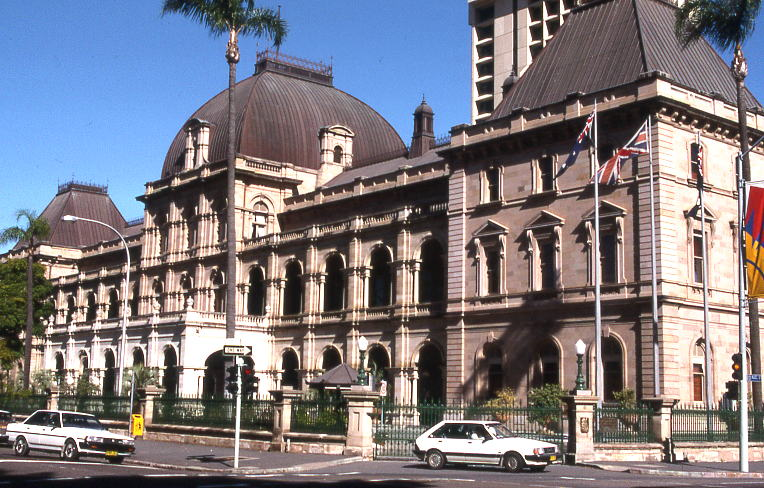
Parliament House, seat of the Queensland Parliament

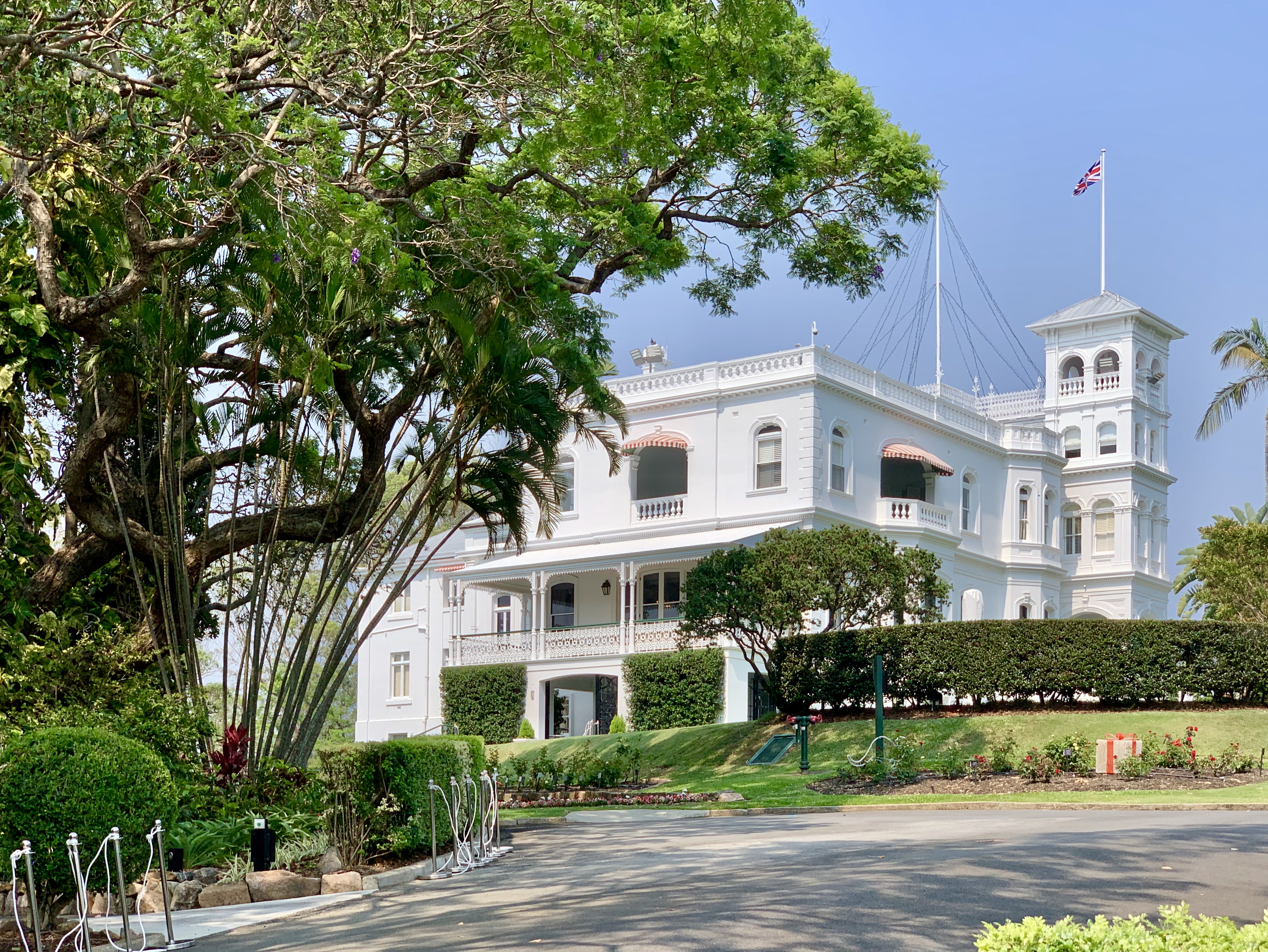
Government House, seat of the Governor

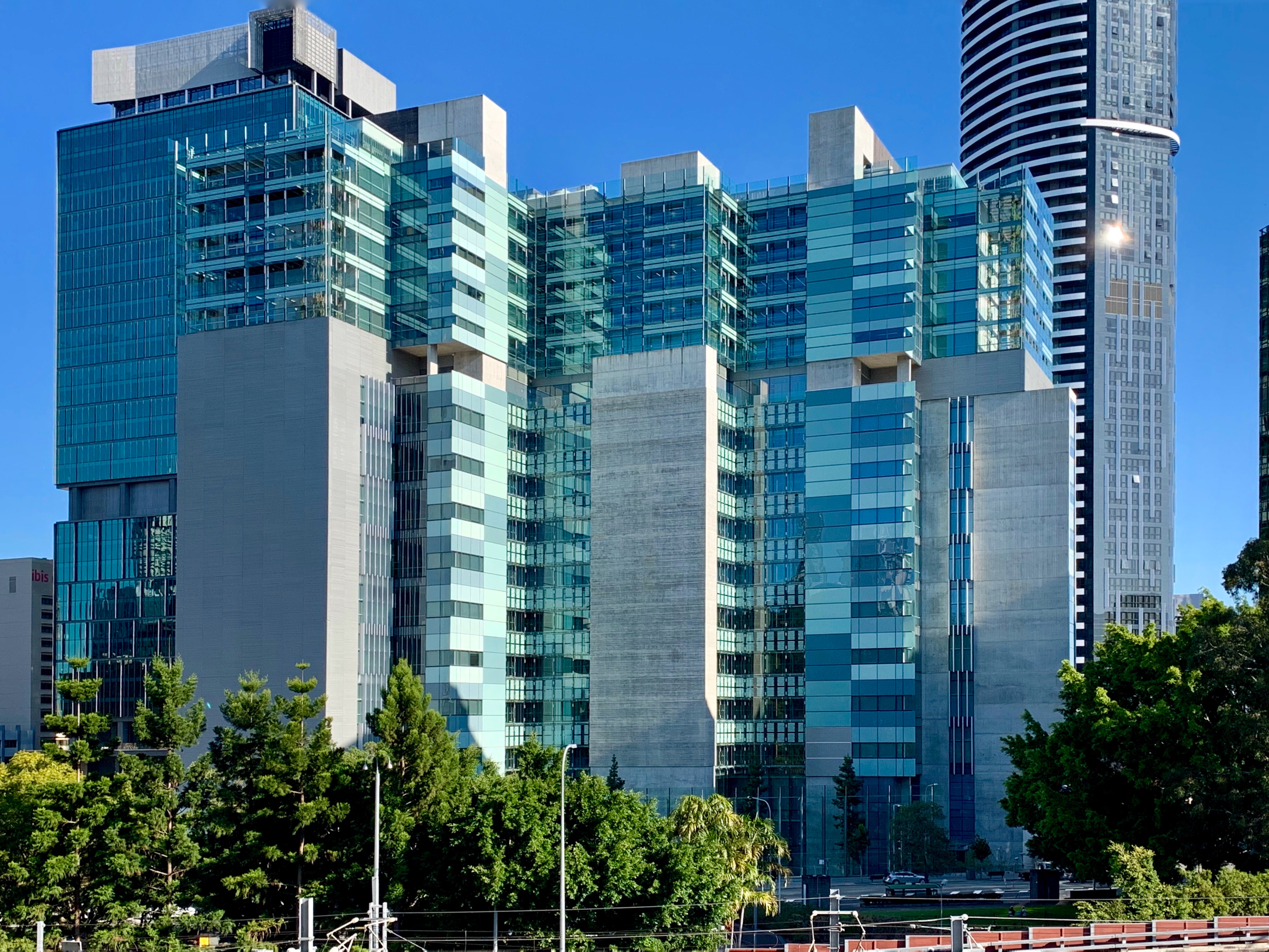
Queen Elizabeth II Courts of Law, headquarters of the Supreme Court of Queensland and District Court of Queensland

=== Local government ===
Local government is the mechanism by which local government areas can manage their own affairs to the extent permitted by the Local Government Act 2009. Queensland is divided into 77 local government areas, which are created by the state government under the legislation. Each local government area has a council responsible for providing a range of local services and utilities. Local councils derive their income from both rates and charges on resident ratepayers, and grants and subsidies from the state and federal governments.

=== Federal representation ===
Queensland – Federal parliamentary delegations
Election
Election	House of Representatives			Senate		
Election	Coalition (Note: Includes the Liberal Party of Australia, National Party of Australia, Liberal National Party of Queensland and Country Liberal Party. In 2008, all Coalition parties in Queensland merged into the Liberal National Party of Queensland.)	Labor	Other (Note: Includes independents and minor parties.)	Coalition	Labor	Other
2001	19	7	1	5	4	3
2004	21	5	1	7	4	1
2007	13	15	1	7	5	0
2010	21	8	1	6	5	1
2013	22	6	2	6	4	2
2016	21	8	1	5	4	3
2019	23	6	1	6	3	3
2022	21	5	4	5	3	4
2025	16	12	2	4	4	4

In the federal Parliament, Queensland accounts for 30 of the 151 electoral divisions in the House of Representatives (based on population size) and 12 of the 76 seats in the Senate (based on equality between the states).

The current partisan makeup of Queensland's House of Representatives delegation is 16 Liberal National, 12 Labor, 1 Australian Greens, and 1 Katter's Australian Party.

The current partisan makeup of Queensland's Senate delegation is 4 Liberal National, 4 Labor, 2 One Nation, and 2 Green.

== Culture ==
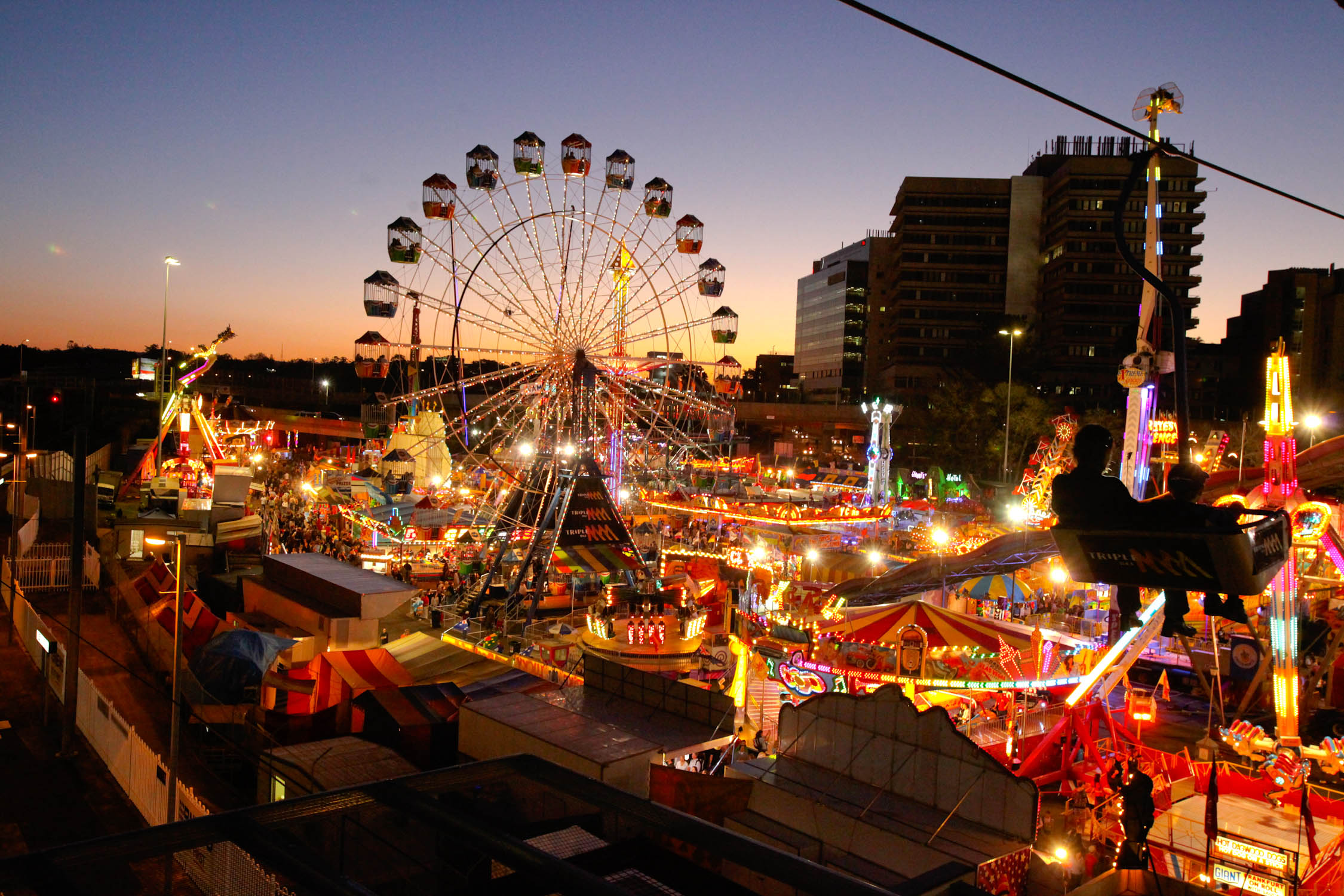
The Ekka (the Royal Queensland Exhibition) is held each August at the Brisbane Showgrounds.

=== Music and performing arts ===
The Queensland Cultural Centre in Brisbane is home to two of the state's major art galleries, the Queensland Art Gallery and the Queensland Gallery of Modern Art.

Other cultural institutions based at the QCC are Queensland Ballet, Opera Queensland, Queensland Theatre Company, and Queensland Symphony Orchestra. Camerata – Queensland's Chamber Orchestra was founded as an ensemble of emerging artists in 1987 by music educator Elizabeth Morgan, evolving into a professional chamber orchestra in 2005. They perform without a conductor, and stage concert series in both Brisbane and Toowoomba. The orchestra is based at the Brisbane Powerhouse. The group performed on the 2026 Bluey TV series soundtrack album, Up Here along with the Queensland Symphony Orchestra and many other musicians.

Many contemporary rock musicians are from Queensland, including the Bee Gees, the Go-Betweens, the Veronicas, the Saints, Savage Garden, and Sheppard, as well as writers such as David Malouf, Nick Earls and Li Cunxin.

=== Events ===
Major annual cultural events include the Royal Queensland Exhibition (known locally as the Ekka), an agricultural exhibition held each August at the Brisbane Showgrounds as well as the Brisbane Festival, which includes one of the nation's largest annual fireworks displays called "Riverfire", which is held each September.

== Sport ==
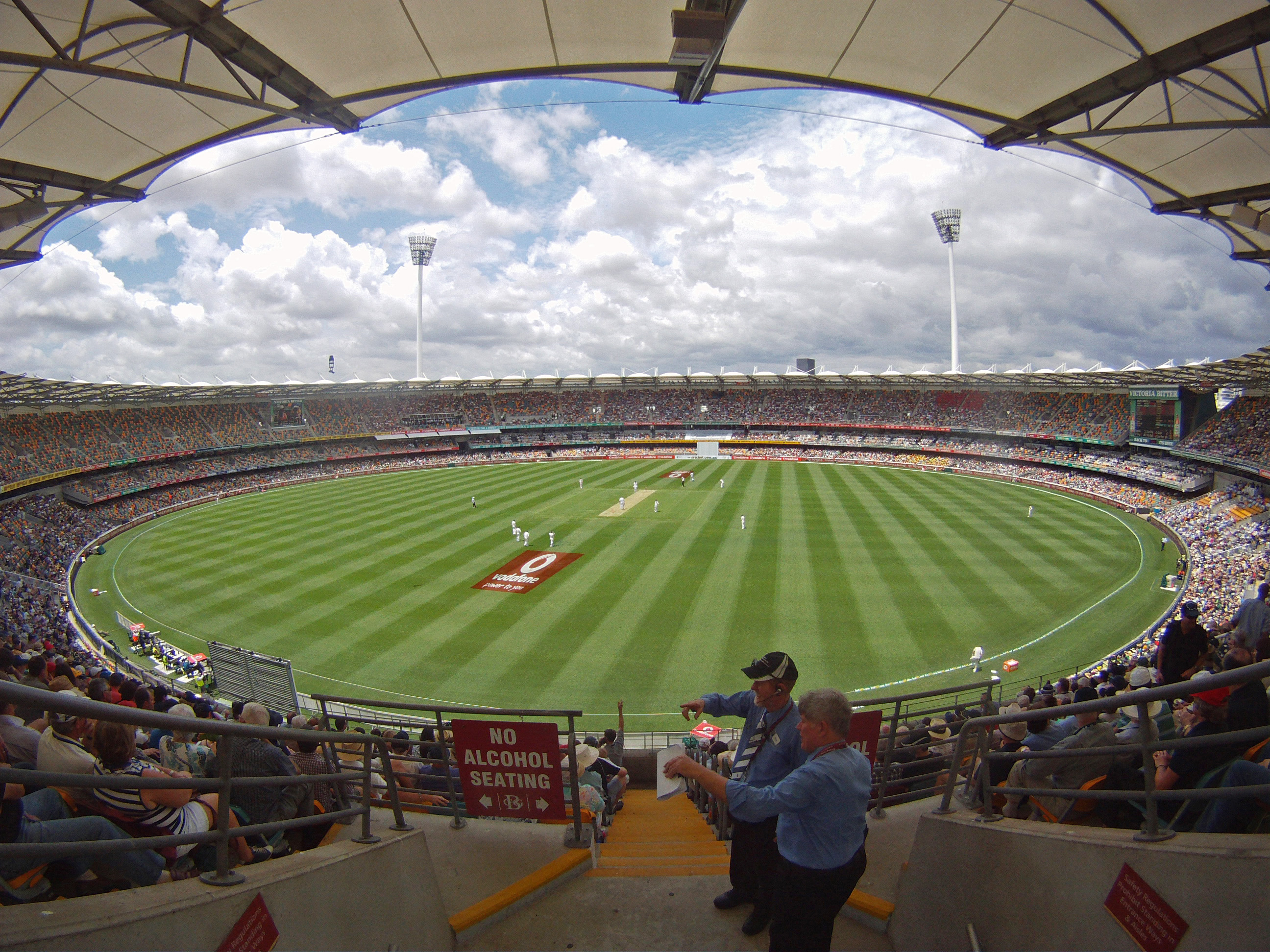
Cricket game at The Gabba, a 42,000-seat round stadium in Brisbane

The state of Queensland is represented in all of Australia's national sporting competitions and it is also host to a number of domestic and international sporting events. The most popular winter and summer team sports are rugby league and cricket, respectively.

In the National Rugby League, the Brisbane Broncos, North Queensland Cowboys, The Dolphins and Gold Coast Titans are based in the state. Rugby league's annual State of Origin series is a major event in the Queensland sporting calendar, with the Queensland Maroons representing the state.

In Rugby union, the state is represented by the Queensland Reds in the Super Rugby.

In cricket, the Queensland Bulls represent the state in the Sheffield Shield and the Ryobi One Day Cup, while the Brisbane Heat compete in the Big Bash League.

Queensland is also home to the Brisbane Lions and the Gold Coast Suns in the Australian Football League (Australian rules football), and the Brisbane Roar FC in the A-League (soccer). In netball, the Queensland Firebirds went undefeated in the 2011 season as they went on to win the Grand Final. Other sports teams are the Brisbane Bullets and the Cairns Taipans, who compete in the National Basketball League.

Swimming is also a popular sport in Queensland, with many Australian team members and international medalists hailing from the state.

Brisbane will host the 2032 Summer Olympics, marking the third time Australia hosted the Olympic Games following Melbourne 1956 and Sydney 2000. Major recurring sporting events hosted in Queensland include: the Gold Coast 600 (motorsport; since 1994), the Gold Coast Marathon (athletics; since 1979), the NRL All Stars Game (rugby league; since 2010), the Townsville 400 (motorsport; since 2009), the Quicksilver Pro and Roxy Pro (surfing) and Australian PGA Championship (golf; since 2000).

== Symbols and emblems ==
The official state emblems of Queensland are prescribed in the Emblems of Queensland Act 2005.

Queen Victoria granted the Queensland Coat of Arms to the Colony of Queensland in 1893, making it the oldest State Arms in Australia. It depicts Queensland's primary industries in the 19th century with a sheaf of wheat, the heads of a bull and a ram, and a column of gold rising from a heap of quartz. Two stalks of sugar cane which surround the state badge at the top, and below is Queensland's state motto, Audax at Fidelis, which means "Bold but Faithful". In 1977, Queen Elizabeth II granted the supporting animals, the brolga and the red deer.

In November 2003 maroon was officially named Queensland's state colour, after many years of association with Queensland sporting teams. In 2025, Queensland Government branding changed to blue, with not yet an impact on the official state colour.

The koala was officially named the animal or faunal, emblem of Queensland in 1971 after a newspaper poll showed strong public support. The Queensland Government introduced the poll due to a proposal by state tourism ministers for all states to adopt a faunal emblem. In January 1986, the brolga was announced as the official bird emblem of Queensland, after many years on the Coat of Arms.

The Cooktown orchid became known as Queensland's floral emblem in 1959, during celebrations to mark the state's centenary, and the Barrier Reef Anemone Fish was officially named as Queensland's aquatic emblem in March 2005.

The sapphire was named the official state gem for Queensland in August 1985.

== Infrastructure ==
=== Transport ===
Queensland is served by several National Highways and, particularly in South East Queensland, a network of freeways such as the M1. The Department of Transport & Main Roads oversees the development and operation of main roads and public transport, including taxis and local aviation.

Principal rail services are provided by Queensland Rail, predominantly between the major centres east of the Great Dividing Range. Freight rail services in Queensland have been provided mostly by Aurizon and Pacific National, with interstate intermodal services provided by Pacific National and SCT Logistics. Major seaports include the Port of Brisbane, Australia's third busiest by value of goods, as well as those at Gladstone, Townsville, and Bundaberg. There are large coal export facilities at Hay Point, Gladstone, and Abbot Point. Major sugar export facilities are located at Lucinda and Mackay.

Brisbane Airport is the main international and domestic gateway serving the state, and is the third busiest in Australia. Other international airports include the Gold Coast Airport, Cairns International Airport, and Townsville Airport. Regional airports with scheduled domestic flights include Toowoomba Wellcamp Airport, Great Barrier Reef Airport, Hervey Bay Airport, Bundaberg Airport, Mackay Airport, Mount Isa Airport, Proserpine / Whitsunday Coast Airport, Rockhampton Airport, and Sunshine Coast Airport.

South East Queensland has an integrated public transport system operated by Translink, which provides services bus, rail, light rail and Brisbane's ferry services through Queensland Rail and contracted operators. The region is divided into seven Fare zones radiating outwards from the Brisbane central business district, which is the central hub for the system. The Queensland Rail City network consists of 152 train stations along 13 suburban rail lines and across the region, and predominantly within Brisbane's metropolitan area. There is also a large bus network including Brisbane's large dedicated bus rapid transit network, the Brisbane busway network. Brisbane's popular ferry services include the CityCat, Cross River, and CityHopper services which have dedicated wharves along the Brisbane River. The G:link, Queensland's only light rail network, operates on the Gold Coast.

The new Queensland Cross River Rail is a metro network that is currently under development within Brisbane and is part of infrastructure to prepare the city for the 2032 Olympic games.

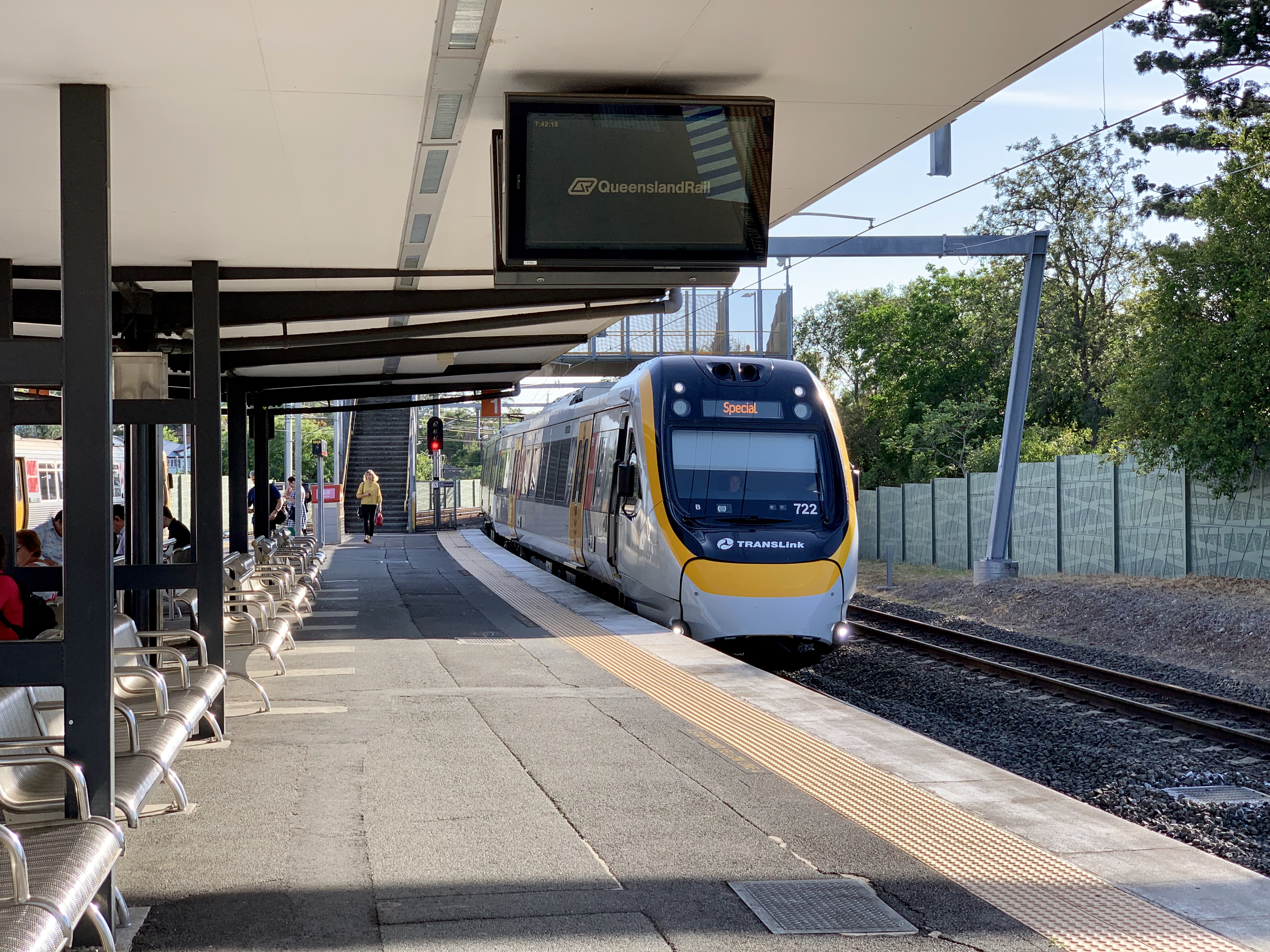
Passenger train at Oxley railway station on the Ipswich/Rosewood line within the Queensland Rail City network

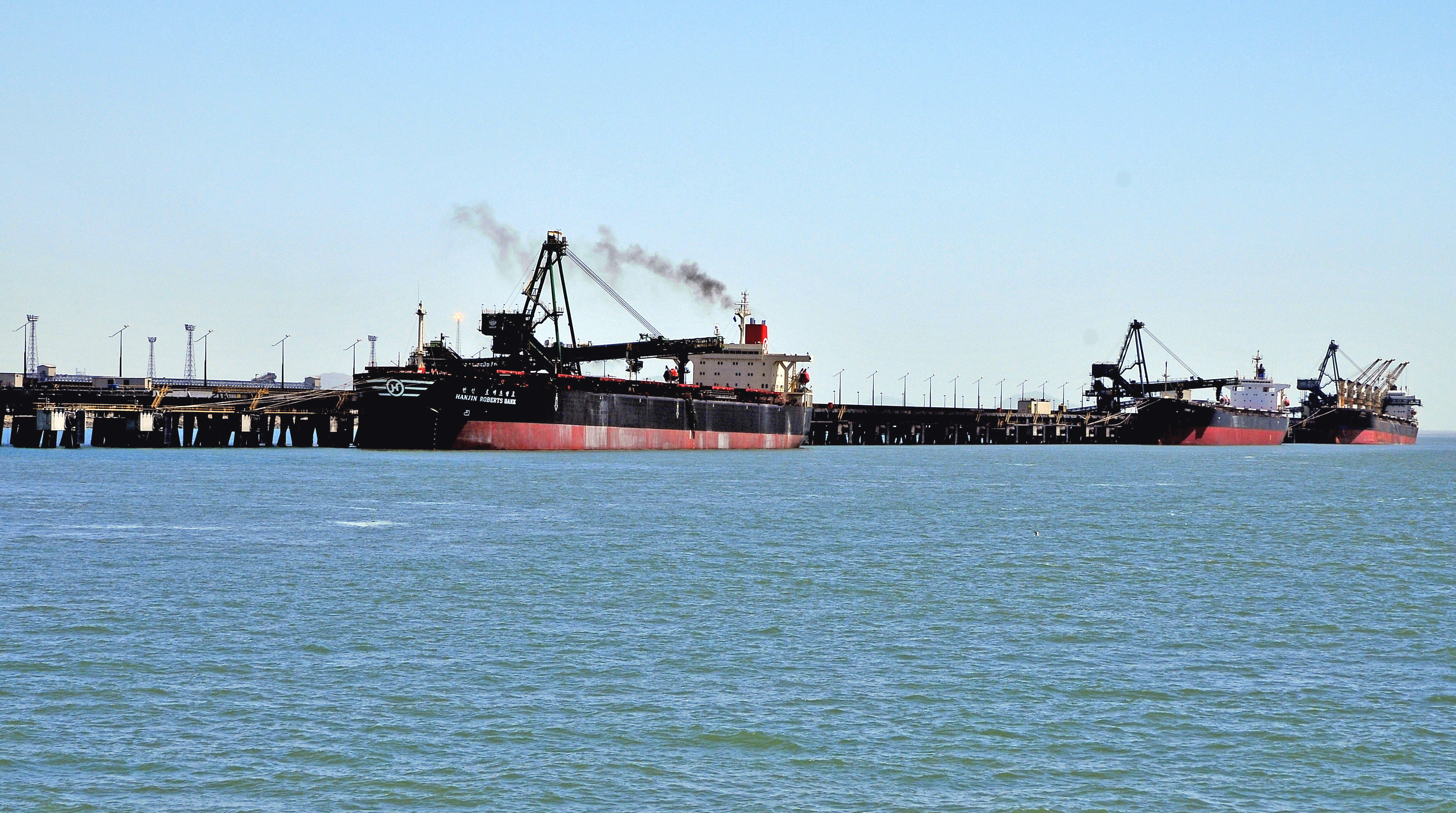
Cargo ships at the Port of Gladstone, Queensland's largest commodity seaport

=== Other utilities ===
Queensland Health operates and administers the state's public health system. There are sixteen regional Health and Hospital Services corresponding to geographical regions which are responsible for delivering public health services within their regions. Major public hospitals include the Royal Brisbane and Women's Hospital, Princess Alexandra Hospital, the Mater Hospital, the Queen Elizabeth II Jubilee Hospital, and the Queensland Children's Hospital in Brisbane, as well as the Townsville University Hospital, Cairns Hospital, Gold Coast Hospital and Gold Coast University Hospital in the regional cities. There are smaller public hospitals, as well as private hospitals, around the state.

== See also ==
- Outline of Australia
- State of North Queensland (Proposed state)

== Sources ==
- Bottoms, Timothy (2013). Conspiracy of Silence: Queensland's frontier killing times. Sydney: Allen & Unwin. ISBN 978-1-74331-382-4.
- Broome, Richard (1988). "The Struggle for Australia : Aboriginal-European Warfare, 1770–1930". In McKernan, Michael; Browne, Margaret; Australian War Memorial (eds.). Australia Two Centuries of War & Peace. Canberra, A.C.T.: Australian War Memorial in association with Allen and Unwin, Australia. pp. 92–120. ISBN 0-642-99502-8.
- Connor, John (2008). "Frontier Wars". In Dennis, Peter; et al. (eds.). The Oxford Companion to Australian Military History (Second ed.). Melbourne: Oxford University Press Australia & New Zealand. ISBN 978-0-19-551784-2.
- Coulthard-Clark, Chris D. (2001). The Encyclopedia of Australia's Battles (Second ed.). Crows Nest, New South Wales: Allen & Unwin. ISBN 1865086347.
- Ørsted-Jensen, Robert (2011). Frontier History Revisited – Queensland and the 'History War'. Coorparoo, Brisbane, Qld: Lux Mundi Publishing. ISBN 9781466386822.
