= Australian Council of Social Service =

Australian organization

- Company type: Non-profit
- Founded: 1956; 69 years ago
- Headquarters: Strawberry Hills, New South Wales, Australia
- Area served: Australia
- Key people: Hang Vo (President); Violet Roumeliotis (Vice President); Cassandra Goldie (CEO)
- Website: acoss.org.au

The Australian Council of Social Service (ACOSS) is an Australian organisation that advocates for action to reduce poverty and inequality, and is the peak body for the community services sector in Australia. It was formed in 1956.

ACOSS is active in areas of social policy, including community sector policy, climate and energy, economics and tax, income support and employment, health, housing and homelessness, and poverty and inequality.

Cassandra Goldie became CEO of ACOSS in 10 July 2010. She was previously the Director of the Sex Discrimination Unit at the Australian Human Rights Commission (HREOC).

The CEO of ACOSS is often interviewed by Australian media for comment and analysis on social matters and policies of the Australian Government.

== Governance ==
ACOSS has a 9-person volunteer Board of Governors, elected according to the constitution adopted in August 2019.

== Controversies ==
In 1991 Federal Opposition leader John Hewson accused ACOSS of seeking to acquire more money than for welfare and making bureaucracies bigger than in helping those in poverty.

== Presidents ==
- March 2023 - present: Hang Vo
- June 2020 - December 2022: Peter McNamara
- January 2016 - June 2020: Tony Reidy
- January 2015 - December 2016: Micaela Cronin
- December 2013 - January 2015: Francis Lynch
- November 2009 – November 2013: Simon Schrapel
- May–November 2009: David Thompson (interim)
- 2005-May 2009: Lin Hatfield Dodds
- 2001-2005: Andrew McCallum
- 1997-2000: Michael Raper
- 1993-1997: Robert Fitzgerald
- 1989-1993: Merle Mitchell
- 1985-1989: Julian Disney

== Members ==
=== State and Territory Councils of Social Service ===
- ACT Council of Social Service (ACTCOSS)
- NSW Council of Social Service (NCOSS)
- South Australian Council of Social Service (SACOSS)
- Northern Territory Council of Social Service (NTCOSS)
- Queensland Council of Social Service (QCOSS)
- Tasmanian Council of Social Service (TasCOSS)
- Victorian Council of Social Service (VCOSS)
- Western Australia Council of Social Service (WACOSS)

=== National constituency organization members ===
- Anti-Poverty Network SA
- Australian Unemployed Workers' Union
- Children and Young People with Disability Australia
- National Council of Single Mothers and their Children
- Women With Disabilities Australia
- YOUNG Campaigns
- People with Disability Australia
- Women With Disabilities Australia

=== National organization members ===
- Adult Learning Australia
- Anglicare Australia
- Anti-poverty Week
- Asylum Seeker Resource Centre
- Australian Alcohol and other Drugs Council
- Australian Association of Social Workers
- Australian Baha’i Community
- Australian Communications Consumer Action Network
- Australian Community Workers Association
- Australian Council of State School Organisations
- Australian Federation of AIDS Organisations
- Australian Federation of Disability Organisations
- Australian Health Promotion Association
- Australian Insulation Foundation
- Australian Men’s Health Forum
- Australian Pensioners & Superannuants Federation
- Australian Red Cross
- Australian Youth Affairs Coalition
- Baptist Care Australia
- Better Renting
- Brotherhood of St Laurence
- Carers Australia
- Catholic Social Services Australia
- Centre for Social Impact
- CHOICE
- Christians Against Poverty
- cohealth
- Community Colleges Australia
- Community Housing Industry Association
- Community Legal Centres Australia
- Community Mental Health Australia
- Community Transport Organisation
- Consumer Action Law Centre
- Consumers Health Forum of Australia
- COTA Australia
- DCSS Australia
- Disability Advocacy Network Australia
- Down Syndrome Australia
- Economic Justice Australia
- Edmund Rice Centre
- Family Relationship Services Australia
- Federation of Ethnic Communities’ Councils of Australia
- Financial Counselling Australia
- Foodbank Australia
- Foundation for Young Australians
- Good Shepherd Australia New Zealand
- Good Things Foundation Australia
- Goodstart Early Learning
- Health Justice Australia
- Homelessness Australia
- Homes for Homes
- HOST International
- Indian (Sub-Cont) Crisis & Support Agency
- InfoXchange
- Jobs Australia
- Justice Connect
- LGBTIQ+ Health Australia
- Life Without Barriers
- Lojic Institute
- MacKillop Family Services
- Mind Australia
- Mission Australia
- MS Australia
- National Aboriginal and Torres Strait Islander Legal Service
- National Aboriginal Community Controlled Health Organisation
- National Association of People with HIV Australia
- National Association of Tenant Organisations
- National Ethnic Disability Alliance
- National Family Violence Prevention Legal Services Forum
- National Shelter
- Office for Social Justice, Australian Catholic Bishops Conference
- Oxfam Australia
- Playgroup Australia
- Public Health Association of Australia
- Rape & Domestic Violence Services Australia
- Reconciliation Australia
- Relationships Australia
- Save the Children
- Secretariat of National Aboriginal & Islander Child Care
- Settlement Council of Australia
- Settlement Services International
- Social Ventures Australia
- Society of St Vincent de Paul National Council
- Syndromes Without a Name (SWAN) Australia
- The Benevolent Society
- The Salvation Army Australia
- The Smith Family
- UnitingCare Australia
- Volunteering Australia
- WESNET
- YMCA Australia
- YWCA Australia

=== Associate Members ===
- Accordwest
- ADRA Australia Limited
- Anglicare Community Services
- Anglicare Victoria
- Association of Children’s Welfare Agencies Ltd. (ACWA)
- Australian Education Union (AEU)
- Australian Refugee and Migrant Care Services Ltd
- Australian Services Union (ASU)
- AWARE Community
- Berry Street
- BeyondHousing
- Blue Sky Community Services
- Caboolture Community Care Inc
- Cairns Alliance of Social Services
- Canberra Community Law
- Catholic Social Services Victoria
- CentaCare New England North West
- Centre for Excellence in Child and Family Welfare
- Centre for Women’s Economic Safety
- Churches Housing Incorporated
- Community Housing Industry Association NSW
- Community Industry Group
- Community Information and Support Victoria
- Community Resources Limited
- Container of Dreams
- CORE Community Services
- Cowra Information & Neighbourhood Centre
- Energetic Communities
- Family Support Newcastle
- Family Violence Legal Service Aboriginal Corporation
- Financial Counsellors’ Association of WA
- Financial Rights Legal Centre
- Glebe Youth Service
- Homelessness NSW
- Illawarra Legal Centre
- Institute of Child Protection Studies
- Jannawi Family Centre
- Lifetime Renewable Energy Pty Ltd
- Lutheran Community Care
- Melbourne’s Leading Nanny Agency
- Mountains Community Resource Network (MCRN)
- Muru Mittigar Limited
- Nepean Community and Neighbourhood Services (NCNS)
- One Future
- Orphans and Widows West Africa Inc.
- PeakCare Queensland Inc
- Peninsula Community Legal Centre Inc.
- Penrith City Council
- Queensland Youth Housing Coalition
- Rainbow Families Inc
- Samaritans Foundation
- Sector Connect
- Single Mothers Lobby Alliance
- Social Futures (Northern Rivers Social Development Council)
- South East Community Links
- South Port Community Housing Group Inc
- Southern Youth and Family Services
- St John’s Youth Services
- Sydney Community Forum
- Tangentyere Council Inc.
- Tenants Queensland
- Think+DO Tank Foundation
- United Workers Union
- Uniting Communities
- Uniting Country SA
- Welfare Rights Centre
- Westgate Community Initiatives Group
- WESTIR Ltd
