= Laurie Matthews =

- Born: 1956 (age 69–70); Camperdown, New South Wales, Australia
- Education: Newington College
- Occupation: CEO founder Caretakers Cottage
- Spouse: Sara Matthews
- Parent(s): Rev. Rex & Gwen Matthews

Laurence Charles Matthews (born 1956), is a housing rights activist who founded Caretakers Cottage a youth homelessness service in Sydney, Australia and is its CEO. Laurie was also a founding member Yfoundations, a peak body organisation for youth homelessness in New South Wales. and has been on the Yfoundations board for a number of years between 1989 and 2011.

Laurie is on the board of Southern Youth and Family Services, a homelessness service based in Wollongong, New South Wales.

== Biography ==
Laurie Matthews is the son of Reverend Rex Matthews and Gwenneth Joy ("Gwen") Matthews. Laurie is married to Sara Matthews and has two brothers and one sister. He was born in Camperdown and his family moved to the Eastern Suburbs around 1970. Laurie attended Newington College and began working after school in his local neighbourhood at the Holdsworth Street Playground (now Holdsworth Community Centre). Under his father's influence, Laurie began working in the social welfare sector.

Rex Matthews, was the minister of the Uniting Church in Paddington, chaplain at the Royal Prince Alfred Hospital and Camperdown Children's Hospital, as well as a journalist and news sub-editor for The Australian.

Laurie's brother Peter Matthews also is on the board of Yfoundations, from 1982-83 as treasurer and 1984 as a board member.

== Career ==
=== Caretakers Cottage ===
Matthews together with his wife Sara, founded the Caretakers Cottage youth refuge in 1977. At the time, funding for the refuge came from the parish's Village Church Centre, however, Matthews and Sara ran the refuge for little and often no pay. Matthews later assumed the role of CEO of the organisation.

Matthews had previously helped set up a local teen drop-in centre ("The Club") from 1972 until it merged into Caretakers Cottage several years later.

=== Phone-A-Home ===
In the early 1980s, Matthews had established an accommodation referral service, "Phone-A-Home," utilizing a computerized system of shared accommodation options in the local area. The project allowed callers to seek accommodation while filtering for particular preferences such as "non-smokers, vegetarians, same musical interests."

=== Other organisations ===
In addition to being CEO of Caretakers Cottage, Matthews is on the board of Southern Youth and Family Services, based in Wollongong. Matthews was also a founding member Yfoundations, a peak body organisation for youth homelessness in New South Wales, and has been on its board during the years of 1989, 1997, 2003 through 2008, 2010, and 2011.

=== In the media ===
Matthews has been cited on issues of youth homelessness. His statements in the press include the prevalence of drug use among homeless youth, the lack of accommodation for homeless youth under the age of 16, on the close link between youth issues with the Ministry for Education (as opposed to the Ministry for Community Services), on the placement of (and the high costs associated with 24-hour supervision of) children in temporary hotel accommodation, following closure of the Ormond and Minali institutions (the last two state-run institutions for children in New South Wales), and on the closure of the Kings Cross and Central Sydney Adolescent Unit (KXCSAU), a service opened by the Department of Family and Community Services in 1986 and threatened with closure in 2012.

== Awards ==
In 2015, Matthews was awarded with a Lifetime Achievement Award by Youth Action, a peak body organisation for young people and youth services in New South Wales.

In 2017, he was awarded an Australia Day Community Service Award by Randwick City Council.

January 2019 Matthews was awarded an Order of Australia Medal OAM

== See also ==
- Caretakers Cottage
- Yfoundations
- Southern Youth and Family Services
