= Detour House =

Non-profit organisation in Sydney, Australia

Detour House is a non-profit organisation servicing homeless and other at-risk girls and women, based in Sydney, Australia. Detour House also incorporates The Girls Refuge (formerly Young People's Refuge), a crisis accommodation service for homeless girls.

== History ==
Detour House was established in 1984, providing a structured three month rehabilitation program for homeless women affected by drugs or alcohol dependence. Young People’s Refuge (YPR) was established in 1975. YPR was one of the first youth refuges established in NSW. Both services are independently funded by the Department of Community Services as Specialist Homeless Services. In 2003, Young People's Refuge fell under the auspices of Detour House, which took over the management of refuge. The entire organisation is overseen by a volunteer management committee of professional women from the community.

=== Going Home Staying Home reforms ===
Following the News South Wales government homelessness reforms in 2012, funding Detour House was threatened, however, the organisation remained funded.

In 2016, Young People's Refuge was renamed to The Girls Refuge.

== Founding of Yfoundations ==
In 1976, Young People's Refuge along with Taldumande and Caretakers Cottage, and other early NSW youth refuges, founded Yfoundations, a peak body organisation, to represent youth refuges to government.

== See also ==
- Homelessness in Australia
- Yfoundations
- Youth Homelessness Matters Day
