= Caretakers Cottage =

Australian non-profit organisation

Caretakers Cottage Inc.
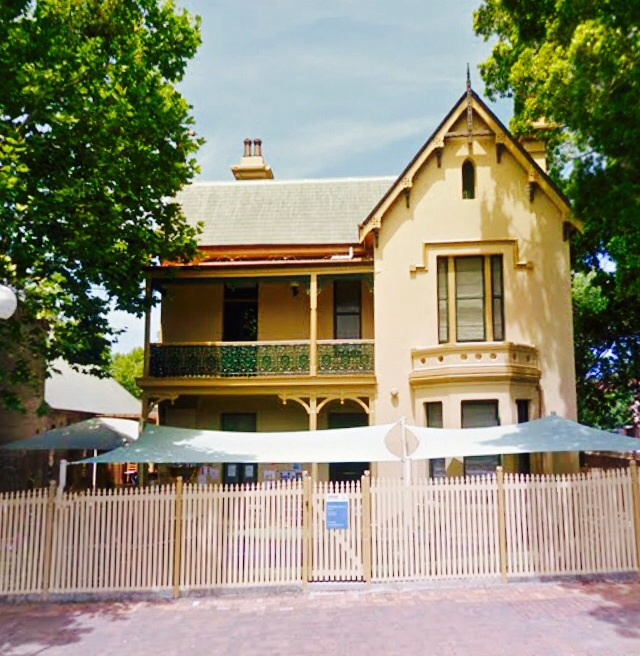
- The former Caretakers Cottage building in Paddington, NSW
- Predecessor: The Club
- Founder: Laurie Matthews
- Founded at: Paddington, NSW
- Type: Non Government Organisation
- VAT ID no.: 84 607 801 657
- Location: Sydney, NSW
- Coordinates: 33.8930376°S 151.25762110000005°E
- Region served: South-Eastern Sydney
- Services: Crisis accommodation and semi-independent accommodation for young people at risk of homelessness
- Members: Yfoundations (1979)
- Subsidiaries: Options Youth Housing
- Website: www.caretakers.org.au
- Formerly called: Paddington Woollahra Youth Service

Caretakers Cottage is an Australian non-profit, non-governmental organisation based in Sydney assisting children and young adults facing homelessness. Caretakers Cottage is funded by the New South Wales Department of Communities and Justice to provide services for young people across Sydney's South-Eastern district. Services include short-term, emergency accommodation, semi-independent living options, case support and early intervention for young people at risk of homelessness.

The early formation of the organisation began in 1972 with the establishment of a teen drop-in centre. The refuge began informally accommodating young people from 1975, and Caretakers Cottage was formally established in 1977 as the Paddington Woollahra Youth Service (PWYS), making it one of the first youth refuges in New South Wales. The organisation has assisted thousands of young people from across Sydney, including many from Sydney's Eastern Suburbs, and an estimated one third of young people assisted are of Aboriginal heritage.

== History ==
=== 1972: The Club ===
The roots of Caretakers Cottage begin in 1972 when Laurie Matthews and family founded a drop in centre for teens called "The Club." The centre was supported by just $40 a week, in collaboration with the Holdsworth Community Centre, helping to support youth in the Eastern Suburbs.

=== 1975–1977: Informal accommodation and later founding ===
In 1975, the Matthews family begin to informally accommodate youth at a property owned by the Oxford Street Uniting Church in Paddington, where Laurie Matthews' father, Reverend Rex Matthews, served as a minister. The Matthews family lived in a home owned by the parish and the original refuge was in a smaller caretaker's cottage located on the premises, hence the refuge's present name. The refuge began as a place for young people coming from the country to stay while they found work and accommodation. Laurie Matthews first ran the refuge out of his own pocket, and after two years, it became one of the first youth refuges in New South Wales to receive funding from Department of Family and Community Services. After receiving government funding, the refuge then moved into the main house where the Matthews family had previously lived. In 1977, Caretakers began receiving funding from the New South Wales Department of Family Community Services (FaCS). During these early years, however, most of the funding for Caretakers Cottage came from the parish's Village Church centre. The refuge was run by Laurie and his wife Sara, who worked for little and often no pay. The organisation was incorporated that year under the name Paddington Woollahra Youth Service (PWYS). By 1980, the refuge had moved from the caretaker's cottage to the parsonage and Reverend Rex Matthews allowed the cottage to house an experiential program, funded by local council, allowing old people to live there independently, in the refuge's place.

Through its informal start and subsequent founding, Caretakers founded one of the first youth refuges in New South Wales. Other early refuges include Young People's Refuge (now an all-female refuge), founded in 1975, and Taldumande Youth Refuge (originally intended as an organisation to care for indigenous Australians), founded in 1976.

==== Eastern House ====
According to a work History of Caretakers written by youth workers Peter Matthews, D. Maler, M. Fulford, & D. Coulter, in 1984, the Caretakers Cottage youth refuge in Paddington was linked to a volunteer "extended family group" at Eastern House, which was next door to the refuge. The members of the family were two parents (Reverend Rex Matthews & his wife Gwenneth Matthews), a 15-year-old sister, 18-year-old brother and a female and male university student.

=== Move to Surry Hills ===
After 15 years of the organisation being centered in Paddington, Caretakers Cottage moved to Surry Hills. The move was preceded by an eviction notice from the Uniting Church who owned the property housing the Caretakers Cottage youth refuge. The New South Wales Department of Housing provided funding for the organisation to purchase a new property, however, the organisation was forced to leave Paddington as a result of the shortage of large family homes available for sale in the area.

=== Move to Bondi ===
Caretakers Cottage moved from Surry Hills to Bondi, where it is currently headquartered. In 2014, the Caretakers Crisis Refuge in Bondi underwent renovations and received the support of Gumtree Roadshow, a corporate social responsibility project by Gumtree Australia, having stylists assist in the refurnishing and redecorating.

==== 30 Year celebration ====
On Tuesday, 23 October 2007, Caretakers Cottage celebrated 30 years since the founding of the youth refuge. In attendance were Mr. Malcolm Turnbull, Member for Wentworth, and Ms. Sylvia Hale of the NSW Greens Party.

==== Going Home Staying Home Launch ====
On 15 May 2015, Caretakers Cottage formally launched their comprehensive program following the "Going Home Staying Home" reforms. The new program partnered Caretakers Cottage services and Ted Noffs Foundation. The event was attended by Brad Hazzard, NSW Minister for Family and Community Services, Gabrielle Upton, NSW Attorney General, and Sally Betts, Mayor of Waverley.

== Programs and services ==
Name	Service	Category	Description
Caretakers Crisis Refuge	Crisis Accommodation	Specialist Homelessness Service	The Caretakers Crisis Youth Refuge, currently located in Bondi, NSW, provides a range of specialist homelessness services for teenagers and young adults. Services include crisis accommodation, support and after-care services to reduce homelessness and assist with independent transition into adulthood.
Options Youth Housing	Semi-Independent Accommodation	Specialist Homelessness Service	Options is a non-profit organisation based in Bondi Junction. Options was founded in 1981 as an independent organisation, providing semi-independent housing for young people. Options fell under the auspices of Yfoundations in 2005 and became a subsidiary of Caretakers Cottage in 2006.
Early Intervention Program	Other Support Services	Specialist Homelessness Service	In 2014, following the NSW Government "Going Home Staying Home" reforms, Caretakers Cottage and the Ted Noffs Foundation formed a joint "Early Intervention Program" to help prevent young people from reaching "crisis point."
Entity Out of Home Care	Crisis Accommodation	Out of Home Care	In 1998, Caretakers Cottage received funding for their Entity Out of Home Care program, specifically funded for young people in care of the Minister for Family and Community Services. Entity provides emergency accommodation and casework support.
Entity Aftercare	Other Support Services	Out of Home Care	The Entity Aftercare program was founded in 2009, geared to assist former residents of Entity.
Horizons Youth Housing	Semi-Independent Accommodation	Out of Home Care	Horizons was founded in 2005 to provide semi-independent housing for young people in State Care.

=== Case management ===
Caretakers Cottage is a Specialist Homeless Service that provides case management in addition to providing accommodation.

When young people come into our care we set about establishing, with them, a case plan that targets all significant aspects of their lives. We deal with basic survival issues such as health and safety, and family relationships, legal matters, education, employment, and training, etc. A number of these young people are able to continue their current school attendance, while we try to re-enrol others who are not long out of school.

— Laurie Matthews, CEO, Caretakers Cottage.

== Partnerships ==
Caretakers Cottage partners with the Ted Noffs Foundation. The partnership commenced as a response to the New South Wales Government "Going Home Staying Home" reforms, first initiated under then Minister for Family and Community Services (FaCS), Pru Goward. Caretakers Cottage and Ted Noffs jointly tendered for a multi-purpose youth homelessness funding under the Going Home Staying Home reforms. The partnership allowed for the full implementation of the reform along with the elements of previous tenders. The partnership has enabled Ted Noffs to provide crisis accommodation with the added focus of drug & alcohol and lifestyle issues.

== Memberships ==
Caretakers Cottage is a member of Yfoundations, a peak body organisation on youth homelessness. Caretakers Cottage and seventeen other youth homelessness services helped found Yfoundations in 1979. The organisation was initially called Youth Refuge Action Group (YRAG), and changed its name several times over the years, including YRA, YRAA, YAA, and presently, Yfoundations.

Caretakers Cottage is a member of the Association of Children's Welfare Agencies, a peak body organisation founded in 1958.

== People ==
=== Laurie Matthews ===
Laurie Matthews serves as CEO of Caretakers Cottage a youth homelessness service in Sydney, Australia. Laurie also serves on the board of Southern Youth and Family Services, a service based in Wollongong. Laurie has also served on the board of Yfoundations for a number of years between 1989 and 2011.

Laurie, together with his wife Sara Matthews, founded the Caretakers Cottage youth refuge in 1977. At the time, funding for the refuge came from the parish's Village Church centre, however, Laurie and Sara ran the refuge for little and often no pay.

In the 1980s, Laurie had established an accommodation referral service, "Phone-A-Home," utilizing a computerized system of shared accommodation options in the local area. The project allowed callers to seek accommodation while filtering for particular preferences such as "non-smokers, vegetarians, same musical interests."

In 2015, Laurie Matthews was awarded with a Lifetime Achievement Award by Youth Action, a peak body organisation for young people and youth services in New South Wales.

== Publications ==
- #HomelessKidsMatter: Youth Refuge Directory – A directory of all New South Wales Specialist Homelessness Services providing crisis accommodation for young people under the age of 18.
- Your Move: Housing Choices for Young People – A comprehensive guide to housing options for young people living in New South Wales.

== See also ==
- Homelessness in Australia
- Ted Noffs Foundation
- Yfoundations
- Youth Homelessness Matters Day
- Laurie Matthews
