= Taldumande Youth Services =

Taldumande Youth Services is a youth homelessness service in New South Wales, Australia, founded in 1976.

"Taldumande" is an Aboriginal word meaning "refuge."

== Founding of Yfoundations ==
In 1976, Taldumande along with Young People's Refuge and Caretakers Cottage, and other early NSW youth refuges, founded Yfoundations, a peak body organisation, to represent youth refuges to government.

== Going Home Staying Home ==
Following the NSW Government's "Going Home Staying Home" reforms to the homelessness sector, Taldumande Youth Services joined a partnership with Mission Australia and contracted with the state to provide services in the northern Sydney region. Following the reforms, Taldumande expanded its service.

== See also ==
- Homelessness in Australia
- Youth Homelessness Matters Day
