= Homelessness SA =

Homelessness SA is the peak body organisation representing homelessness services in South Australia. The group was formed in 2001 as a merger of three peak body groups which separately represented homeless men, women and youth. The groups were Youth Housing Network (YHN), Council to Homeless Persons SA (CHPSA), and the Women's Emergency Services Coalition (WESC). Homelessness SA advocates on behalf of agencies and homeless people across SA.

== Aims ==
Homelessness SA seeks to represent its member services to government and to foster greater connection between services.

== See also ==
- Homelessness in Australia
