= Homelessness Australia =

Homelessness service organisation in Australia

Homelessness Australia (HA) is the national peak body organisation for homelessness services and homeless people in Australia. The organisation provides systemic advocacy for the sector and works in collaboration with support services, state and national homelessness organisations, other peak organisations, government agencies and the broader community. Homelessness Australia was formed in late 1998 as the Australian Federation of Homelessness Organisations (AFHO) by the Council to Homeless Persons Australia (CHPA), National Youth Coalition for Housing (NYCH), and Women's Services Network (WESNET). The organisation was established with the mission of advancing research and promoting national policy and action to reduce homelessness.

== Positions ==
The organisation maintains that without strong national peak bodies, government decision makers may ignore the important welfare issues of affordable housing and homelessness.

HA and other homelessness services launched a #VoteHome campaign, proposing that government assist in halving the number of homeless by 2025.

HA has stated that the often cited statistics on homelessness do not reflect those "on the verge" of homelessness, which they estimate to be at 850,000.

== Events ==
Since 2007, Homelessness Australia has coordinated a national awareness week for homeless people, Homeless Persons' Week.

== See also ==
- Homelessness in Australia
- Homelessness NSW
- Yfoundations
