= Homeless Persons' Week =

Awareness week in Australia

Homeless Persons' Week (HPW) is an annual event publicizing the plight of homeless people in Australia. The event is held in the first full week of August each year, and is coordinated by Homelessness Australia, the peak body organisation for the Australian homelessness sector. Government and NGOs aim to change the public understanding of homelessness as being a problem beyond street sleepers. Primary homelessness, or people sleeping rough, is not the only form of homelessness in Australia and is not representative of the true state and scale of the homeless population. Of the 122,000 people in Australia who were estimated to be homeless at the 2021 census, about 16,000 (15%) were sleeping rough on the streets. The others are those living in other unsuitable housing or in homeless shelters.

Homelessness Week came about from various churches and missions running winter vigils to remember people who had died on the streets. These vigils were normally held in August as it is the coldest time of the year in Australia, when most people were likely to be overcome by the elements. In 2007, Homelessness Australia began coordinating the event as a national awareness week.

In 2013, a bikers' club in Western Sydney organised an HPW event which included a ride to distribute blankets for street sleepers.

== See also ==
- Homelessness in Australia
- Youth Homelessness Matters Day
- Homelessness Action Week (Canada)
