= Southern Youth and Family Services =

Australian non-profit organisation

Southern Youth and Family Services (SYFS) is a non-profit organisation which operates a number of youth homelessness programs in regional New South Wales, Australia. Among the organisation's program is a crisis youth refuge in Wollongong, a youth and family centre in Warilla, as well as the Resourcing Adolescents to Gain Essentials Scheme (RAGE) in Nowra which provides material/financial support for bond, moving expenses, travel, financial support, detox and rehab.

== People ==
Narelle Clay is the organization's CEO.

Narelle has served as the Chairperson for Homelessness Australia, a national peak body organisation on homelessness. And currently serves as the Social and Community Services President for the Australian Services Union.

Narelle is a 2005 recipient of the Order of Australia award.

== See also ==
- Homelessness in Australia
- Youth Homelessness Matters Day
