= Sally Betts =

Australian local government politician

Councillor Sally Betts

Mayor of Waverley
- In office 30 September 2008 – 22 September 2011
- Deputy: Kerryn Sloan; Miriam Guttman-Jones
- Preceded by: Ingrid Strewe
- Succeeded by: John Wakefield
- In office 27 September 2012 – 26 September 2017
- Deputy: Tony Kay
- Preceded by: John Wakefield
- Succeeded by: John Wakefield

Councillor of Waverley Council for Hunter Ward
- Incumbent
- Assumed office September 1995

Personal details
- Born: South Africa
- Party: Liberal Party of Australia (New South Wales Division)

Sally Betts was an Australian Liberal local government politician. First elected as a Councillor for Waverley Council in the eastern suburbs of Sydney in 1995, she was the Mayor of Waverley from 2008–2011 and 2012–2017, and the Liberal Party candidate for the seat of Waverley at the 1988 New South Wales state election. She did not run in the October 2024 council election.

== Mayor of Waverley ==
=== Support for SHS funding ===
Sally Betts has stated her support for the NSW government's funding of Specialist Homelessness Service (SHS) providers, saying "It is hard to criticise the Government for funding such organisations as Wesley Mission, St Vincent’s de Paul, Caretakers Cottage, The Uniting Church, Salvation Army, Ted Noffs, Jewish House and in fact B Miles when these organisations are obviously most capable of dealing with homelessness and indeed delivering specific women’s services in our community." Betts criticised a local council decision that was thought to be turned into a political campaign against then Minister for Family and Community Services, Gabrielle Upton, who had been instrumental in increasing homelessness funding. Ms Betts said "Using the homeless as a political football is repugnant and council would not support any such ploy."

=== Reference letter incident ===
In 2015, Betts received some media attention and some public criticism following her intervention, writing a character reference on behalf of convicted rapist, Luke Lazarus.

In addition to the reference letter incident, Betts also made headlines for seeking to introduce a school education program at Waverley Action for Youth Services, a local youth centre, intended for girls to minimise “risky behaviour.”
