= Homelessness NSW =

Homelessness NSW is the peak body organisation representing homelessness services in New South Wales, Australia. Homelessness NSW advocates on behalf of agencies and homeless people across NSW, with a particular focus on single men, single women, families and children.

== Positions ==
Homelessness NSW has argued that current voting laws in Australia do not account for the situation of homeless people. For example, women escaping domestic violence may feel unsafe attending a public polling booth, however, fear for safety is not a valid excuse for requiring a postal vote. And rough sleepers may lack valid identification.

The organisation has stated that the general lack of affordable housing in Australia has clogged up the crisis system as people could not be moved on to more permanent living arrangements.

== See also ==
- Homelessness in Australia
- Yfoundations
