= Poverty in Australia =

Poverty in Australia refers to the incidence and measurement of relative poverty within Australia. Relative income poverty is typically measured as the percentage of the population earning less than the median wage of the working population.

In 2023, the Australian Council of Social Service (ACOSS) released a report stating that relative poverty was increasing in Australia. It estimated that as of 2019–2020, 3.3 million people, or 13.4% of the population, were living below the internationally accepted relative poverty threshold of 50% of a country's median income. The report also estimated that 761,000 children (16.6%) under the age of 15 were living in relative poverty.

== Defining poverty ==
The primary method of measuring poverty is by establishing a poverty line and determining how many people fall below it. Poverty lines can be set as either absolute or relative, but Australia does not have an official poverty line of either type. The ACOSS/UNSW report series, entitled Poverty in Australia uses two poverty lines and also accounts for people's housing costs. One poverty line, used by The Organisation for Economic Co-operation and Development (OECD) and in this study, is set at 50% of the median household income, while the other is set at 60% of the median income.

=== Absolute poverty, extreme poverty ===
First introduced in 1990, the "dollar-a-day" poverty line measured absolute poverty according to the standards of the world's poorest countries. The World Bank defined the new international poverty line as $1.27 a day for 2005 (equivalent to $1.00 a day in 1996 US prices) but it was later updated to $1.25 and $2.50 per day. Absolute poverty, extreme poverty, or abject poverty is 'a condition characterised by severe deprivation of basic human needs, including food, safe drinking water, sanitation facilities, health, shelter, education, and information. It depends not only on income but also on access to services.'

The term 'absolute poverty', when used in this context, is usually synonymous with 'extreme poverty'. Robert McNamara, the former President of the World Bank, described absolute or extreme poverty as, '...a condition so limited by malnutrition, illiteracy, disease, squalid surroundings, high infant mortality, and low life expectancy as to be beneath any reasonable definition of human decency'. (Note: In his book entitled The End of Poverty Jeffrey Sachs argued that extreme global poverty could be eliminated by 2025 if the wealthy countries of the world were to increase their combined foreign aid budgets to between $135 billion and $195 billion from 2005 to 2015. In 2004, 1.1 billion people lived in extreme poverty on less than a dollar a day.) In his article published in Analysis & Policy Observatory, Robert Tanton notes that, 'While this amount is appropriate for third world countries, in Australia, the amount required to meet these basic needs will naturally be much higher because prices of these basic necessities are higher'.

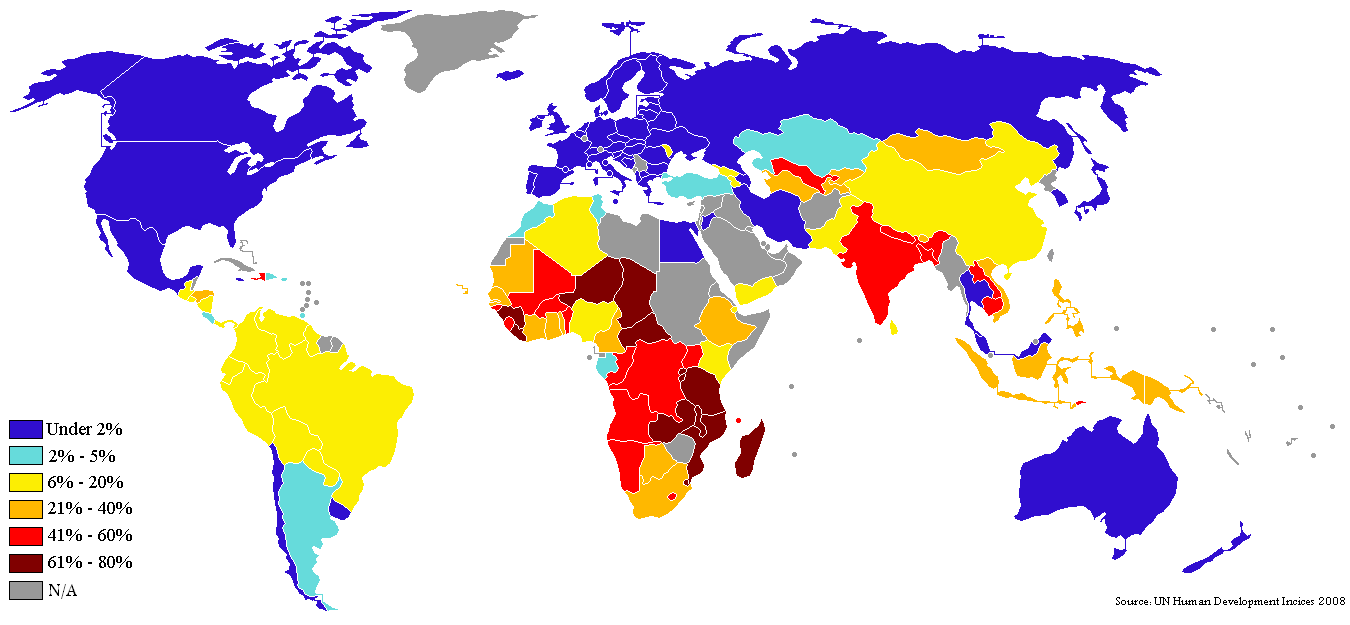
2008 map of world poverty by country, showing the percentage of the population living on less than $1.25 per day

However, as the amount of wealth required for survival is not the same in all places and time periods—particularly in highly developed countries where few people would fall below the World Bank's poverty lines—countries often develop their own national poverty lines.

=== Relative poverty ===
Poverty can also be measured in relative terms, where the poverty line is set as a proportion of the average income or wealth within society.

There are many different ways to calculate relative poverty, resulting in varying levels of poverty, and researchers often debate where the line should be drawn. For example, the Smith Family and NATSEM (The National Centre for Social and Economic Modelling) report in 2000 indicated as many as 1 in 8 Australians were experiencing poverty. The Centre for Independent Studies (CIS) argues that their research suggests the figure is at least 1 in 12 and could even be as low as 1 in 20. This discrepancy arises because their poverty lines were determined in different ways:

1. The Smith family researchers "added up all the pay packets in Australia and divided them by the number of wage earners. That average is then halved to find the poverty line" (the Mean).
2. The CIS "ranks all the pay packets in descending order, finds the wage in the very middle of that range and then halves that... wage to find the poverty line" (the Median). This results in very different outcomes.

The problem with these measures is that they focus exclusively on income. However, poverty is also defined by other indicators, such as education, health, access to services and infrastructure, vulnerability, social exclusion, and access to social capital.

The most widely used indicator for considering non-income factors is the Human Development Index (HDI), compiled yearly by the United Nations Development Program (UNDP), which combines measures for income, health, and education. For advanced economies, the Human Poverty Index (HPI-2) was developed, which takes into account the higher levels of income, health, and education in these countries. Australia ranks very highly on these global indexes.

A relative poverty line was calculated in Australia for the Henderson poverty inquiry in 1973. It was $62.70 a week, which was the disposable income required to support the basic needs of a family of two adults and two dependent children at the time. This poverty line has been updated regularly by the Melbourne Institute to reflect the increase in average incomes. For a single unemployed person, it was $445.40 per week (including housing costs) in March 2020. In Australia, the OECD poverty would equate to a "disposable income of less than $358 per week for a single adult (higher for larger households to account for their greater costs). In recent times, the amount of money a family with two adults and two dependent children needs to survive has jumped to $1,145.61 per week due to inflation and increased grocery prices.

== Incidence of relative poverty in Australia ==
Median total personal weekly income in Australia divided geographically by statistical local area, at the 2011 census

Median total family weekly income in Australia divided geographically by statistical local area, at the 2011 census

Median total household weekly income in Australia divided geographically by statistical local area, at the 2011 census

=== 2022 poverty line ===
According to ACOSS in 2022:

1. 3.3 million Australians are below the poverty line. (13.4%)
2. 761,000 children live below the poverty line. (16.6%)

This report highlighted the relationship between poverty and unemployment with the underemployed facing greater risks of poverty particularly with the increasing casualization of the workforce.

=== Child poverty ===
Australia's child poverty rate falls in the middle of the international rankings. In 2007, UNICEF's report on child poverty in OECD countries revealed that Australia had the 14th highest child poverty rate.

The child poverty rate is estimated at 0.13 (under 17 years of age) according to OECD statistics (using the median income) from 2013 – 2017. According to ACOSS, children under the age of 15 have a poverty rate of 17.3%, and young people aged 15 to 24 have a rate of 13.9%. They suggest the high poverty rate is related to the high poverty rate among single adults (estimated 25%). This is high compared to the total national poverty rate of 12.8% according to OECD statistics. National Centre For Social And Economic Modeling (NATSEM) suggests another reason for high child poverty rates could be the unavailability of affordable housing for low-income adults. They found that 39% of families with children under the age of 15 were presented with unaffordable mortgages, which suggests rising mortgage prices in Australia may be increasing the child poverty rate.

=== Elderly Poverty ===
According to statistics by the OECD (using median household income), the poverty rates of citizens over 66 are more than double the national average at 0.257. To look at Australia's elderly poverty rate comparatively, it ranks #4 among the OECD nations, 8 times the lowest ranking of 0.031 for France, the Netherlands, and Denmark. The rate is more comparable to that of other liberal economies, with the US at 0.229 and the UK at 0.142. Although these elderly poverty rates are low, some sources indicate this may be because home ownership is high in Australia among the elderly. For example, Australian Bureau of Statistics' 2009–10 Survey of Income and Housing indicates that 33% of households own their homes without a mortgage, whereas 36% own a home with a mortgage (that's 21% of homeowners with a mortgage). This is relevant when compared with the Home-ownership in the United States, where the Washington Post estimates 66% of US homeowners have some type of mortgage. Australia's high home ownership rates and low mortgage rates may be a factor in determining the wealth of citizens over 66 years of age, not reflected in the elderly poverty rate.

=== Poverty among Indigenous Australians ===
In 2016, 31% of Aboriginal and Torres Strait Islander Australians lived in households whose income was below the poverty line (using the "50% of the median equivalized disposable household income before housing" poverty line). Nationally, Indigenous poverty rates in Australia declined slowly over the decade 2006–2016, falling from 34% in 2006 to 33% in 2011 and 31% in 2016. However, there is substantial geographical variation in Indigenous poverty rates and trends, with poverty rates being lowest in more urban areas. In very remote areas, where poverty rates increased between 2006 and 2016, the Indigenous poverty rate was 53% in 2016.

== History of poverty in Australia ==
=== 20th century ===
In the years following the end of the Second World War, and during Australia's long post-war economic boom, it was widely believed that the introduction of the welfare state together with the emergence of the affluent society had finally put an end to poverty in "the lucky country". The mid-to-late Sixties, however, saw a "rediscovery" of poverty, as it was found that many Australians had failed to share in the post-war economic boom.

A number of researchers and organizations highlighted the persistence of poverty in Australia. According to one academic in 1960, Helen Hughes, about a third of the half a million widows and aged and invalid pensioners in Australia were estimated by social workers to be living in poverty. In 1959, another academic by the name of James Jupp wrote about the "submerged tenth" of the Australian population left out of the country's economic prosperity, including Aborigines, shack dwellers, deserted wives, unemployed migrants, slum dwellers, pensioners, and "no-hopers". Research into the extent of poverty in Australia was also undertaken by the Victorian and Australian Councils of Social Service, while the church-based welfare agency, the Brotherhood of St. Laurence, carried out a number of studies into the needs of low-income families and pensioners.

In 1963, a Melbourne university lecturer called Ray Brown estimated that 5% of Australians lived in chronic poverty, with articles published in the radical magazine "Dissent" by David Scott, Leon Glezer, and Michael Keating coming to similar conclusions. In 1966 popular awareness of poverty was further extended by the publication of John Stubb's "The Hidden People", where he estimated that half a million Australians lived in poverty.

Housing conditions also remained underdeveloped for many Australians. A census carried out in 1954 revealed that 49,148 families were living in huts and sheds, while by the end of 1972, more than 1.5 million people in the major cities were living in flats and houses that were not connected to a complete sewerage reticulation system. In 1971, the Institute of Applied Economic Research estimated that at least 1 million Australians lived in poverty. A report by Justice John A. Nimmo from the start of the Seventies estimated that there were about a million Australians living below a "miserably poor poverty line."

Other studies on poverty carried out by the International Labour Office in Geneva also revealed high incidence of poverty in Australia. In 1973, using a national poverty line, it was estimated that 20.8% of Australians lived in poverty before benefits were taken into account, and 11.0% after benefits were taken into account. By contrast, using a standard poverty line, it was estimated that 24.3% of Australians lived in poverty before benefits, and 19.3% after benefits.

==== Henderson Inquiry ====
In 1966, the Melbourne University Institute of Applied Economic and Social Research, headed by Professor Ronald Henderson, set out to measure the extent of poverty in the city of Melbourne. A poverty line was set at $33, which was close to the basic wage plus child endowment for two children. Based on this figure, 7.7% of all family units in Melbourne lived on or below the poverty line, while an additional 5.2% "hovered dangerously close to the minimum level". This has been cited as the "first systematic attempt to estimate the extent of poverty in Australia".

A Commission of Inquiry into Poverty was set up in August 1972 by the Liberal Prime Minister William McMahon, and Henderson was appointed as Chairman of the inquiry, which came to be known as the "Henderson Commission". The Whitlam Government elected later that year expanded the size of the Commission and scope, giving it specific responsibility to focus on the extent of poverty in Australia together with the groups most at risk of experiencing poverty, the income needs of those living in poverty, and issues relating to housing and welfare services. These issues were addressed in the commission's first main report, "Poverty in Australia", which was released in April 1975.

In this report, the Commission sought to identify the extent of poverty in Australia in terms of inadequate income relative to need, and the poverty line was defined as a percentage of average earnings, adjusted for household size. The poverty line was set at 56.5% of average earnings for a "standard" family (consisting of a male breadwinner, a woman not in paid employment, and two dependent children). According to the report, 8.2% of the population lived in poverty in 1972–73, or 6.4% when housing costs were taken into account. Before housing costs, over 10% of income units in 1972–73 were below the commission's poverty line, while a further 8% were defined as 'rather poor', having an income of less than 20% above that line. After housing costs were taken into account, the percentage of income units living below the poverty line was about 7%.

The Commission also estimated that more than 50% of Aboriginal Australians had living standards below the poverty line and less than 20% above it. The infant mortality rates among Aboriginal Australians in the period 1973–77 were 63 deaths per thousand live births in the Northern Territory and 71 per thousand in Queensland. This compared with a rate of 62 per thousand in South America, 59 per thousand in Africa, 41 per thousand in Central America, 68 per thousand in Asia, and 15 per thousand among non-Aboriginal Australians.

=== 21st century ===
Australia's Human Poverty Index was given as 12.1 in the UN's final calculation of the index, which was published in 2007. The rating was the 13th lowest of the 19 OECD countries for which the index was calculated.

Reports released by the Australian Council of Social Service in 2016 and 2020 stated that poverty was growing in Australia, respectively estimating that 2.9 million people (13.3% of total) and 3.2 million people (13.6% of total) had an income below 50% of the national median. The reports also respectively estimated that there were 731,000 (17.5%) and 774,000 (17.7%) children under the age of 15 that were in poverty.

== See also ==
- Homelessness in Australia
- Home ownership in Australia
- Median household income in Australia and New Zealand
- Melbourne Institute of Applied Economic and Social Research
- Social security in Australia

General:

- Poverty by country
