= Ted Noffs Foundation =

- Founded: 31 December 1970
- Founder: Reverend Ted Noffs
- Type: Non-profit
- Registration no.: 49 018 049 971
- Legal status: Charity
- Location: National office: Randwick, New South Wales
- Region served: Australian Capital Territory; New South Wales; Queensland
- Product: Youth and community and addiction services
- Key people: CEO: Matt Noffs; Secretary: Naomi Noffs
- Revenue: $19,895,910 (2024)
- Expenses: $19,807,435 (2024)
- Employees: 158
- Volunteers: 180
- Website: noffs.org.au
- Formerly called: Wayside Foundation

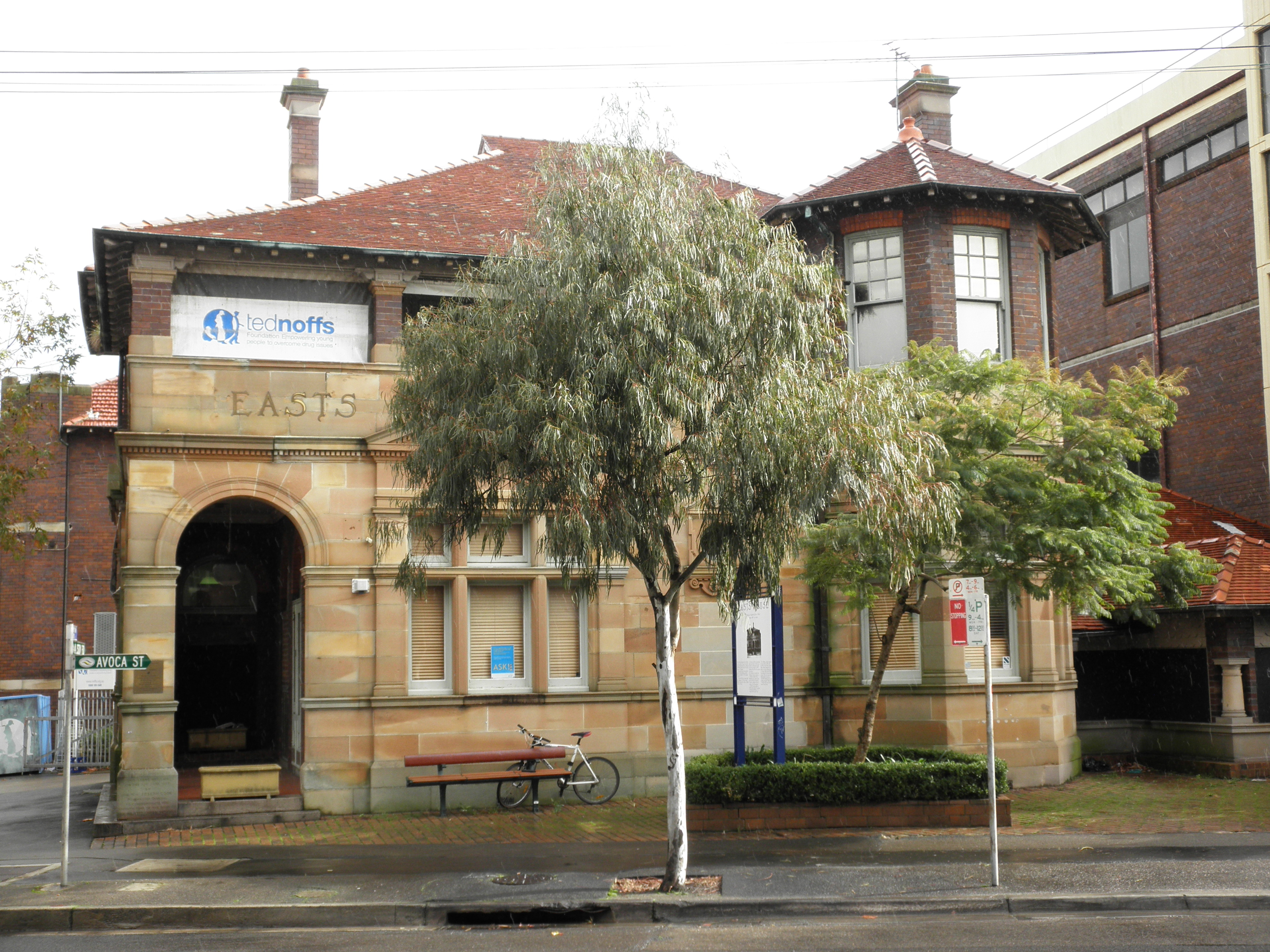
The Ted Noffs Foundation headquarters in Randwick

The Ted Noffs Foundation (also known as Noffs) is a charitable organisation based in Randwick, New South Wales, Australia. Founded as the Wayside Foundation in 1970 in Sydney by the Reverend Ted Noffs and his wife, Margaret, the organisation has expanded to become a significant provider of youth drug and alcohol services in Australia.

The foundation operates programs and facilities in New South Wales, Queensland and the Australian Capital Territory. Its services and initiatives include residential treatment centres for adolescents with drug and alcohol problems, homelessness support, education and early intervention, and counselling services for families, adolescents and Indigenous Australians. Noffs' social enterprises include "op shops". It also provides advocacy and policy advice to Federal and State governments and has research partnerships with the University of New South Wales.

== History ==
The organisation's predecessor, The Wayside Foundation, was established by the Reverend Ted Noffs in 1970. It was renamed The Ted Noffs Foundation in 1992. The Wayside Foundation provided formal structure and a source of fund-raising to support the activities of the Wayside Chapel that Noffs had developed during the 1960s. The Wayside Chapel supported underprivileged communities and disaffected youth who had been drawn to the Sydney suburb of Kings Cross. Notably, in 1964, the chapel became the first office of the Foundation for Aboriginal Affairs, from where Noffs and Charlie Perkins co-ordinated the 1965 Freedom Ride calling for an end to segregation and equal rights for Indigenous Australians. In the late 1960s, a focus for Noffs became combatting drug addiction, with the Wayside opening Australia's first drug referral centre in 1967.

=== As the Wayside Foundation ===
An increase in hard drug use around the streets of Kings Cross in the 1970s saw Noffs go against the church by championing acceptance, prevention and harm-minimisation over punishment. The Wayside Chapel became a hub for the community and provided social events for those who were marginalised due to addiction or living outside of social norms. Throughout the decade, the Wayside Foundation helped to expand programs beyond the Sydney chapel across the country. This included the launch of the Life Education program in 1979 that teaches school-aged children about the dangers of drugs and promotes healthy lifestyles and choices. Outside of its drug and alcohol related programs, the Wayside Foundation provided aid for women and children from Gaunomu in newly-independent Papua New Guinea, after authorities rounded up and jailed all the isolated village's men for rioting in 1976.

By the 1980s, thousands of weddings and naming ceremonies for people of all faiths were conducted by Ted Noffs at Wayside, across Sydney and interstate. The Wayside's outreach work continued through the Shepherd of the Streets program, providing a 24 hour service that aimed to reconnect children under-16 on the streets of Kings Cross with estranged parents. The Life Education program received federal funding to expand nationally in 1985, with a Life Education Centre opening in the Melbourne suburb of Balwyn on 14 April. With machines provided by IBM in 1986, Wayside experimented with developing educational software to support the Life Education Centres, which that year expected to deliver programs to 360,000 children between the ages of 4 and 12 in three states.

In March 1987, Ted Noffs suffered a stroke and was unable to return to work. Following Ted's stroke, Wesley Noffs and his wife Amanda took on increasing leadership roles with the Wayside Foundation. In 1992, the Wayside Foundation was renamed the Ted Noffs Foundation.

=== As the Ted Noffs Foundation ===
After eight years of incapacitation, Reverend Ted Noffs died on 6 April 1995. In November 1995, the Foundation first presented the Program for Adolescent Life Management (PALM), developed in partnership with the National Drug and Alcohol Research Centre. Considered one of Ted's chief legacies, PALM was Australia’s first residential drug treatment program for youth aged between 13–18.

In 1998, Prime Minister John Howard appointed the Foundation's CEO, Wesley Noffs to the first Australian National Council on Drugs, giving the organisation a role in shaping national drug policy. As General Manager of the foundation, Amanda Noffs worked with law firm Mallesons to establish a free legal aid service for young people called ASK! in November 2001. The service supported 220 young people in its first three years of operation.

The foundation opened a second residential treatment facility in Watson, a suburb of Canberra in 2000. By the mid-2000s, non-residential counselling services (including programs focused on Aboriginal youth) were operating in Mount Druitt in Western Sydney, as well as Sydney and the ACT. The PALM program also expanded to provide rural beds in Coffs Harbour and Dubbo, and by 2008 had capacity of 42 places across all locations.

Noffs established its first "Street University" in Liverpool, Sydney in 2008. The service provides education and mentoring through a range of creative, vocational and therapeutic programs for young people who had fallen out of the mainstream education system, and pathways to support with drug, crime and mental-health related issues as well as employment and further studies. It was followed by a second Street University at Mount Druitt to extend services in the region.

To enhance support for youth after completing residential treatment, The Ted Noffs Foundation developed a continuing care program as a component of PALM. This program was formalised in 2011 as Continuing Adolescent Life Management (CALM), providing up to three years of ongoing support for former PALM residents, assisting them to reconnect with the community.

By 2014, Ted's grandson, Matt Noffs had succeeded Wesley Noffs as CEO. During that year, the New South Wales Government announced reforms to address homelessness. Under the Going Home, Staying Home initiative, Noffs developed specialised youth homelessness services. Through partnerships with state agencies, these programs provide early intervention as well as crisis accommodation. Clients of the service are supported with appropriate counselling and case management.

The Queensland Department of Health funded Noffs to establish a further three Street Universities in Brisbane, the Gold Coast and Sunshine Coast in South East Queensland, opening in June 2015.

In 2018, the Ted Noffs Foundation helped to deliver a trial pill testing service at the Groovin' the Moo music festival in Canberra, the first of its kind in Australia. By 2020, Noffs had opened its eighth Street University in Penrith

Noffs received $1.4 million from the ACT Government in 2022 to upgrade the Canberra facility, in support of legislative changes to address addiction as a health issue rather than a criminal one. Noffs expanded its services to Newcastle in 2025, opening a residential treatment facility and Street University in the city.

In 2026, the Queensland Government announced it had partnered with the foundation to deliver a new one to three week residential program for youth aged 8–17 showing signs of anti-social and criminal behaviours. The camps are held at Doonan on the Sunshine Coast as part of the Crisafulli government's youth justice reforms.

== Services ==
The organisation runs programs that include:

=== The Street University ===
Street University in Canberra

Street Universities are located in metropolitan areas of NSW, ACT and QLD and aim to support young people aged 12–25. Street Universities offer activities and workshops in creative skills such as music and photography to create social connections, education and therapeutic pathways. Counselling is offered to help young people improve their mental health and to reduce their drug use and involvement in crime. The programs provide mentoring and alternatives for youth who have fallen out of mainstream education. A 2020 evaluation by the University of New South Wales found The Street University program was effective in both engaging at-risk youth and significantly reducing drug use and psychological distress, while improving overall wellbeing.

As of 2026, Noffs operates nine Street Universities in the following locations:

- Caboolture
- Canberra
- Hamilton
- Katoomba
- Liverpool
- Mount Druitt
- Penrith
- Southport
- Woodridge

A Street University opened in Townsville in 2023, however it ceased operating in 2025 after the Queensland Government withdrew funding.

=== Program for Adolescent Life Management (PALM) ===
The Program for Adolescent Life Management was the product of a research project undertaken by the Ted Noffs Foundation and National Drug and Alcohol Centre (NDARC) in the mid 1990s. The project established the best practice for adolescent drug treatment in clients aged 13–18, which Noffs then implemented as the first of its kind in Australia. PALM is a three-month residential treatment program for young people with diagnosed substance dependency. It provides a holistic approach that includes strategies to deal with many risk factors and consequences of drug abuse behaviours. The program offers counselling, family support, group work, educational modules, recreational activities, develops skills and supports to prevent relapse and includes an aftercare component. There is evidence that shows youth who complete PALM have less convictions and better outcomes from the criminal justice system than those who were referred but declined participation.

As of 2026, the residential PALM program is offered in Sydney, Canberra, Brisbane and Newcastle.

=== Continuing and non-residential care ===
Noffs has a number of programs designed to provide aftercare treatment for youth who have been in residential rehabilitation programs, or juvenile detention. Continuing Adolescent Life Management (CALM) formalised the continuing care offered as follow up for PALM participants. Noffs began delivering the Staying on Track program in Townsville and North Queensland in 2025 in partnership with the Queensland Department of Youth Justice and Victim Support. This 12 month program aims to reduce recidivism in youth transitioning out of juvenile detention. Noffs also delivers a "regional reset" youth justice intervention program on the Sunshine Coast.

=== Specialist homelessness services ===
Noffs provides specialist homeless services in Sydney and Canberra.

Noffs partnered with Weave Youth and Community Services to deliver Launchpad, a youth homelessness coordination service funded by the City of Sydney and NSW Department of Family and Community Services in 2014. In 2016, Launchpad began a trial program to provide short term rental accommodation through two properties in inner-Sydney, with rents set at 25% of a client's income. Through a partnership with Caretakers Cottage, Noffs provides crisis accommodation in South East Sydney for youth with drug and alcohol issues.

Commencing in Canberra with funding from the ACT Government in 2012, "Take Hold" matches young people who are homeless, or at risk of homelessness and are referred to the service with volunteer mentors from the community. Mentors develop relationships and help them develop life skills and achieve individual goals. The program supported over 550 young people in its first five years of operation.

=== Alcohol, drug and mental health counselling ===
Through out-client services, the Ted Noffs Foundation provides drug and alcohol and mental health counselling services delivered in a variety of ways. During the 2000s the foundation received funding for school-based alcohol and other drugs counselling services in government high schools, including in Sydney and Wollongong. Noffs has run other school and community based workshops for Aboriginal youth, particularly in Western Sydney. These initiatives build self-esteem by engaging with indigenous culture or shared activities.

=== Social enterprises ===
OneNoffs opened in Randwick in 2009. This op-shop adopted a business model focused on upcycling, inviting students and designers to transform damaged or soiled vintage garments into one-off wearable fashion pieces. In 2010, Project Runway Australia designer and mentor Henry Roth donated 200 wedding gowns to kickstart the project. Garments were sold with a biography of the designer and profits are split between the creator and fundraising for the Noffs Foundations youth programs.

Gideon Shoes was founded by Matt and Rupert Noffs in 2009 to raise money for the Street University program and create employment opportunities for former clients. The shoes are hand-made in Australia and include a premium range that use Kangaroo and cane toad leather. These were launched to the global market in New York City with the support of publicist Kelly Cutrone. Gideon shoes have been sold to customers including Justin Timberlake and Jamiroquai vocalist Jay Kay, raising funds and awareness of the Ted Noffs Foundation's work globally.

The Foundation operates a chain of op-shops across Sydney as a fund raising venture, staffed by volunteers.

== Partnerships ==
Ted Noffs Foundation has formalised partnerships with the University of New South Wales as a research sponsor. Through the Australian Research Council, grant funding for many of Noffs' programs is subject to evaluation by the university's researchers to inform design and implementation.

With the majority of the organisation's revenue received via government grants, Noffs has working partnerships with many state and territory departments and agencies. It tenders to operate programs and services either as a stand-alone provider, or in partnership with other charities and not-for-profit organisations, such as with Caretakers Cottage to provide youth homelessness services in South-Eastern Sydney.

== Advocacy ==
The Ted Noffs Foundation was a vocal opponent of a private member's bill introduced by Senator Jacqui Lambie in 2015 that proposed empowering parents to force their children into drug rehabilitation programs. This followed Lambie's public acknowledgement that her own son was struggling with methamphetamine addiction. The foundation argued that the relationship between adolescents and their parents was critical to the success of treatment, and that coercion would undermine the healing process. CEO Matt Noffs published op-ed pieces in major national newspapers including The Sydney Morning Herald, criticising Lambie's proposed approach.

During the 2010s, the foundation advocated for pill testing at music festivals as a harm reduction strategy. Formal talks were announced in 2017, with the ACT Government considering allowing a legal trial in partnership with the Ted Noffs Foundation at the Spilt Milk festival. In an Australian first trial at the Canberra leg of the 2018 Groovin' the Moo festival, the Ted Noffs Foundation announced that a consortium of harm reduction advocates had facilitated the testing of 85 samples at the festival, with two found to be potentially lethal.

== Controversies ==
The Sydney Morning Herald reported in 2016 that the Ted Noffs Foundation had received donations from The Coca-Cola Company. Matt Noffs defended the donations, explaining that it was a one-off $10,000 grant in support of a Street Health program in 2014, and since that time they had learned more about the beverage industry and drug-like health effects of sugar.

The Townsville Street University, located in the suburb of Kirwan was announced in 2023 as Australia's largest. After opening, local businesses and residents complained of an increase in anti-social behaviour in the vicinity, with some calling for the centre to be closed or relocated. State MP Nick Dametto described the Street University as looking like a good solution to address youth crime on paper, but was critical of its implementation and lack of oversight, claiming this had led to incidents of violence and intimidation by youths who remained in the area after it closed at night. The Queensland Government withdrew ongoing funding for the project as part of a shift in youth justice priorities in 2025.

In January 2026, ACT Police appealed to the public for assistance investigating allegations that a youth worker employed at the foundation's Watson facility had sexually abused a teenager between 2002–2003.

== See also ==
- Ted Noffs
- Wayside Chapel
- LifeEd
- Illicit drug use in Australia
- Homelessness in Australia
