= Wollongong Out of Workers Union =

Former union of unemployed people

The Wollongong Out of Workers Union (WOW) was a community organisation of unemployed young people in Australia. From the early 1980s to the early 1990s, it was uniquely successful in its longevity, in the fact that it was controlled by unemployed people themselves, and in the success of its political campaigns.

== Background ==
The industrial city of Wollongong lies 80 kilometres south of Sydney in the state of New South Wales. The city's economy was based on the Port Kembla Steelworks which in the early 1970s employed more than 20,000 workers. In the late 1970s falling sales caused a series of lay-offs in the steelworks and in the mines which supplied it with coal.

== Beginnings ==
Several factors contributed to the inception of WOW. By 1983, youth unemployment in some suburbs had risen to more than 50%. There was already a group of young people loosely organised in YAPO (Young and Pissed Off) who had undertaken a graffiti campaign against unemployment. They were supported by a number of factors within the town.

The traditionally militant labour movement had responded powerfully to the lay-offs with coal miners storming the entrance to Parliament House in Canberra and steelworkers and others marching from Wollongong to Sydney, to be met outside the NSW Parliament with a mass demonstration of support. Cultural workers, centred on Redback Graphix, produced art work and a film "Greetings from Wollongong" which highlighted realities in Wollongong. While business was attempting to badge the area as the Leisure Coast. YAPO's graffiti claimed "It's not leisure, it's unemployment". The core of YAPO drew in more unemployed young people and in April 1983 named themselves WOW. WOW stated that it was “dedicated to preserving and promoting the independent voice of the unemployed”. Voting membership was only available to people who were unemployed and the elected conveners were required to report back to regular general meetings.

== Years of WOW ==
WOW's first action was to journey 250 km to Canberra to present the incoming Labor Government with a "Log of Claims" on behalf of the unemployed. A handful of members established a Tent Embassy outside the Parliament and were successful in meeting with a number of Government Ministers.

Back in Wollongong, WOW began its "Steal, Sleepout or Starve” campaign, to highlight the fact that young unemployed people had to survive on $40 per week. In the middle of June, with icy westerly winds whipping down on the city, WOW members began a two-week day and night vigil outside the Social Security offices in Market Street. The aim was to collect the signatures of all the unemployed in central Wollongong, on a petition demanding dole increases, and by sleeping out on the street, in the middle of winter, to highlight youth homelessness.

When some of the WOW members were hospitalised, suffering from exposure, it was decided to break into and occupy one of the empty houses across the road. With community support, including that of the South Coast Labour Council, who put pressure on the police and the owner, this house became WOW's offices for the next six years.

The WOW House became the focus for a range of activities. They kept the issue of unemployment before the public eye with a stream of media releases and media appearances and published a monthly tabloid newspaper, "The Gong." They achieved observer status on the South Coast Labour Council and briefly received government funding before rejecting the government's terms and conditions.

WOW's services included a drop-in centre, welfare rights centre, soup kitchen, library, layout and graphics workshop, dark room, recording studio, accommodation and a food cooperative. Its welfare rights centre provided assistance with collective and self-advocacy in dealing with government departments and with employers, and provided advice and assistance about forms of self-help, both legal and otherwise. The centre helped school people in welfare regulations and self-advocacy and utilised a form of direct-action casework staging militant group actions when grievances remained unsolved. In 1984 when it feedback from members showed that unemployed people with children were being doubly penalised by the tax system, WOW members staged a sit-in in the Social Security offices and demanded a meeting with the Minister to get the tax regulations changed. Within an hour the Minister had agreed to meet them, provided they could be in Canberra by nine o'clock the following morning.

After six years of often frenzied activity, the organisation declined with core members moving on and members suffering from the exhaustion of trying to live on the dole long term. WOW closed down in 1989. An attempt to revive the group in the early 1990s was unsuccessful.

== See also ==
- Australian Unemployed Workers' Union
