= Disability in Australia =

Four million people in Australia (18.5%) reported having a disability in 2009, according to the results of the Survey of Disability, Ageing and Carers. (Note: For the purposes of Survey of Disability, Ageing and Carers, disability is defined as any limitation, restriction or impairment which restricts everyday activities and has lasted or is likely to last for at least six months. Examples range from loss of sight that is not corrected by glasses, to arthritis which causes difficulty dressing, to advanced dementia that requires constant help and supervision.) Males and females were similarly affected by disability (18% and 19% respectively).

== Demographics ==
People in need of assistance in a core activity as a percentage of the total population, subdivided by statistical local area, at the 2011 census.

Just under one in five Australians (18.5%) reported disability in 2009. A further 21% had a long-term health condition that did not restrict their everyday activities. The remaining 60% of the Australian population had neither a disability nor a long-term health condition. Of those with a reported disability, 87% had a specific limitation or restriction; that is, an impairment restricting their ability to perform communication, mobility or self-care activities, or a restriction associated with schooling or employment.

The disability rate increases steadily with age, with younger people less likely to report a disability than older people. Of those aged four years and under, 3.4% were affected by disability, compared with 40% of those aged between 65 and 69 and 88% of those aged 90 years and over.

Rates of disability and rates of profound or severe core-activity limitation for 5- to 14-year-old males (11% and 6.6% respectively) were close to double those for females in the same age group (6.1% and 3.0% respectively). In contrast, women aged 90 years and over had a higher rate of profound or severe core-activity limitations (75%) than men of the same age (58%).

In 2015, there were 2.1 million Australians of working age with disability. Of these, 1.0 million were employed and another 114,900 were looking for work rounding to 53.4% of working age people with disability were in the labour force which compares to 83.2% of people with no disability. In 2015, 25.0% of people with a profound or severe limitation were in the labour force, compared with 58.9% of those with a mild limitation. In 2012, the labour force participation rate was higher for people with profound or severe limitations at 29.7%. In 2015, almost one in five Australians reported living with disability (18.3% or 4.3 million people). A further 22.1% of Australians had a long-term health condition but no disability, while the remaining 59.5% had neither disability nor a long-term health condition.

In 2015, 18.6% of females and 18.0% of males had disability. Differences between males and females was most pronounced amongst people in older age groups with a 68.3% of females aged 90 years and over had a profound or severe limitation compared with 51.2% of males. At some ages there were higher proportions of males with disability such as for age groups 5 to 14 years (males 12.0% and females 7.0%) and 65 to 69 years (males 39.7% and females 36.0%).

The SDAC data on older people (those aged 65 years and over) from Australia's ageing population shows that there were around 3.5 million older Australians in 2015, representing one in every seven people or 15.1% of the population in which this proportion has increased from 14.3% in 2012. Older Australians living in households were more active, with the proportion that participated in physical activities for exercise or recreation increasing from 44.5% in 2012 to 49.2% in 2015. The majority of older Australians were living in households (94.8%), while 5.2% or one in twenty lived in cared accommodation such as nursing homes. While the proportion of older Australians has increased, the prevalence of disability amongst them has decreased. In 2015, 50.7% of older people were living with disability, down from 52.7% in 2012. Two-thirds of older Australians (67.3%) that reported their income lived in a household with an equivalised gross household income that was in the lowest two quintiles. This proportion has decreased from 74.6% in 2012.

Indigenous Australians experience disability at higher rates than non-Indigenous Australians.

=== Trends ===
The prevalence of disability in Australia fell from 20% in 2003 to 18.5% in 2009. After removing the effects of different age structures the age standardised rate also fell by 2.1 percentage points. The decrease is particularly noticeable in the younger age groups. From 2003 to 2009, the disability rate for 15- to 24-year-olds fell from 9.0% to 6.6%. Over the same period the rate of disability also decreased for those aged between 25 and 34 from 11% to 8.6%. Similarly, 22% of 45- to 54-year-olds reported a disability in 2003, compared with 18% in 2009.

The rate of profound or severe limitation in the core activities of communication, mobility and self-care declined, from 6.3% in 2003 to 5.8% in 2009. Much of the decrease in the prevalence of disability between 2003 and 2009 is due to a decline in the proportion of Australians disabled by physical health conditions, such as asthma and heart disease.

The incidence of disability caused by physical conditions, as opposed to mental or behavioural disorders, dropped from 17% in 2003, to 15% in 2009. For instance, in 2003, 6.8% of Australians had a disability primarily caused by musculoskeletal disorders such as arthritis and back problems, with this proportion declining to 6.5% in 2009. Likewise, the incidence of disability caused by diseases of the circulatory system dropped from 1.8% to 1.4%. In 2003, 8.8% of people aged in the 65 years and older group reported a disability due to diseases of the circulatory system, compared with 7.4% in 2009.

The incidence of disability caused by asthma also declined, from 0.8% in 2003 to 0.5% in 2009. Amongst younger people (0 to 17 years), the incidence of disability caused by asthma almost halved between 2003 and 2009, from 0.9% in 2003 to 0.5% in 2009. Of those aged between 18 and 44 years, the incidence of asthma-related disability also decreased, from 0.5% in 2003 to 0.3%. In addition, for this age group, the proportion of people with a disability due to back problems reduced, from 2.6% in 2003 to 1.9% in 2009.

The incidence of disability due to back problems also declined amongst those aged between 45 and 64 years. In this age group, 5.2% of people reported a disability as a result of back problems in 2009, compared with 6.0% in 2003. By contrast, the prevalence of disability resultant from back problems amongst those aged 65 and over has increased since 2003, from 4.9% to 6.3%.

== Law ==
In 1992, a High Court case was held, asking who should decide if a disabled girl was to have a sterilisation procedure. Since that time, all decisions about this kind of procedure have been heard in the Family Court or similar bodies. The Disability Discrimination Act 1992 (DDA) was an act passed by the Parliament of Australia in 1992 to promote the rights of people with disabilities in certain areas such as housing, education and provision of goods and services. It shares a common philosophy with other disability discrimination acts around the world that have emerged in the late 20th and early 21st century, as well as earlier civil rights legislation designed to prevent racial discrimination and sex discrimination. Elizabeth Hastings was appointed as the first Disability Discrimination Commissioner in 1993.

At the time of the enactment of the DDA, a variety of anti-discrimination acts for people with disabilities already existed in the different state legislatures, some dating back to the early 1980s. All States and Territories except Tasmania and the Northern Territory had anti-discrimination laws in place, and these two places had legislation under consideration. There were three reasons given for enacting a federal law:

- To standardise the scope of rights offered around the country
- To implement the Australian Government's obligations as a signatory to international declarations on the rights of people with disabilities.
- To enable regulation of discriminatory practices of Commonwealth authorities.

Complaints made under the DDA are made to the Australian Human Rights Commission (previously known as the Human Rights and Equal Opportunity Commission, HREOC), which also handles complaints relating to the Racial Discrimination Act 1975, Sex Discrimination Act 1984, Age Discrimination Act 2004 and the Human Rights and Equal Opportunity Commission Act 1986.

In December 1976, the Dunstan Government in South Australia set up a Committee on the Rights of Persons with Handicaps conducted by Supreme Court judge Sir Charles Bright, which reported in December 1978.

A Productivity Commission enquiry was initiated by the Australian government to evaluate the effectiveness of the act, and published its findings in 2004. The Commission found that while there is still room for improvement, particularly in reducing discrimination in employment, overall the DDA has been reasonably effective. Specifically, the Commission found that people with a disability were less likely to finish school, to have a TAFE or university qualification and to be employed. They are more likely to have a below average income, be on a pension, live in public housing and in prison. The average personal income for people with a disability is 44 per cent of the income of other Australians.

DisabilityCare Australia, formerly known as the National Disability Insurance Scheme (NDIS), is a healthcare program initiated by the Australian government. The bill was introduced into parliament in November 2012. In July 2013 the first stage of DisabilityCare Australia commenced in South Australia, Tasmania, the Hunter Region in New South Wales and the Barwon area of Victoria, while the Australian Capital Territory will commence in July 2014.

People with disabilities are over-represented in the Australian prison system, as half of all people in the prison system have a disability.

== Carers ==
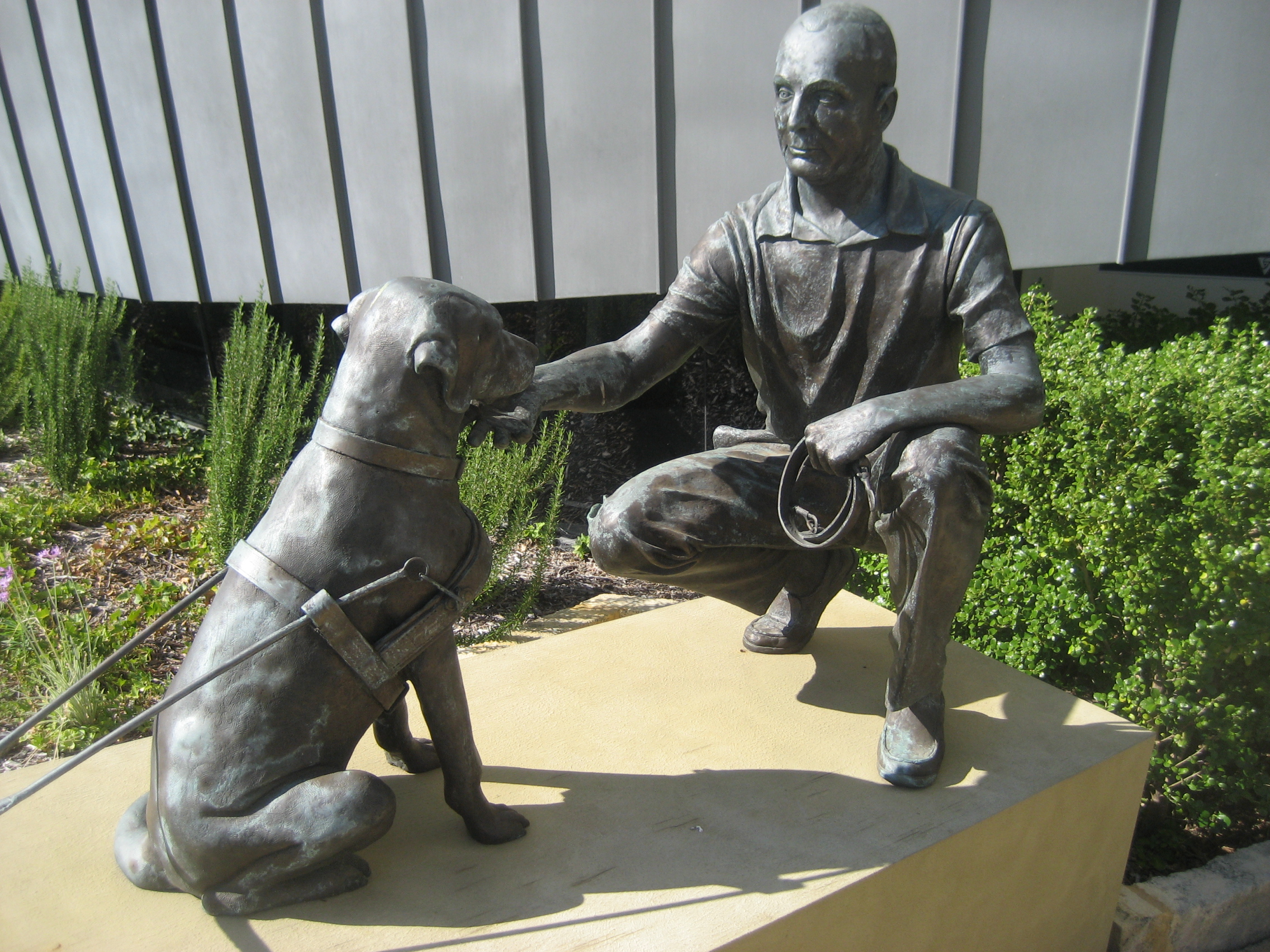
A statue to Dr Arnold Cook and a guide dog.

In 2009, there were 2.6 million carers who provided assistance to those who needed help because of disability or old age. Just under one third of these (29%) were primary carers; that is, people who provided the majority of the informal help needed by a person with a disability or aged 60 years and over. Over two-thirds of primary carers (68%) were women. Thirteen percent of women were involved in a caring role, compared with 11% of men. The gender difference among carers was most pronounced for those aged 45 to 54 years, 16% of men and 23% of women in this age group provided care for a person with a disability or aged 60 years and over.

The proportion of Australians involved in caring for a person with a disability or an older person declined from 13% in 2003 to 12% in 2009, in line with the decrease in disability prevalence.

Australia is one of six nations that have implemented a carer system, in which their program follows under a more liberal democracy style that has family carers provide the majority of care to disabled and frail older people. However, most receive no formal services: 56% of primary carers supporting a disabled person under 65 and 65% of primary carers of older people had no such assistance in 2009. An official 2011 report concluded that carer support is "administered in an ad hoc way across a number of programs and jurisdictions" and a report on the welfare of Australians found that 38% of primary carers felt that they needed more support in maintaining their own health, as well as physical, emotional and financial support.

In 1985, Australia introduced Carer Pension, Carer Payment (CP), to provide income support for carers unable to support themselves through substantial paid employment. It is means-tested on the income of both the care provider and the care receiver, who must also meet an assessment of disability. However, it is not subject to activity testing and not included in the 'activation' policies applied to most other forms of income support for working-age people. In 2006, CP recipients participated in paid work, unpaid work, education or training for up to 25 hours per week, however, only 23% had earnings while receiving it. Reasons for this outcome included the strain of caring responsibilities, inadequate skills and training, and the carer's own health problem or disability: about 40% of recipients had not been in employment when they started caring and/or receiving CP. Many carers rely on government income support as their main source of income, however, reflecting their lower rates of labour force participation and concentration in part-time work. In 2003, income support was the main source of personal cash income for 40% of Australian carers, compared with 24% of other people.

In a 2009 Survey of Disability, Ageing, and Carers (SDAC), Australia identified 529,000 working-age partner-carers – 27% of all carers of working age. Also identified 188,000 "primary" partner-carers, who constituted the largest group of working-age primary carers (34%). Just over half (55%) of this group were women. Partner-carers in Australia tend to be older: 70% of working-age partner-carers were over 45, and over 40% were aged 55–64, although there were few gender differences in their age profiles (ABS, 2011).

Among working-age primary carers, nearly half the partner-carers spent less than 20 hours per week providing care, but around 20% cared for 20–40 hours per week and a third intensively (40+ hours per week). Across all age groups, women were more likely than men to provide intensive levels of care.

Female partner-carers had provided care over a longer period of time than males: among primary partner-carers, 58% of men and 63% of women had been caring for five years or more. Partner-carers in Australia, are most likely to provide high levels of support because they are likely to live with the person for whom they care. The SDAC data show that nearly half of all carers, and over 90% of primary carers, assisted a spouse with a profound or severe limitation. 73% of primary partner-carers supported a person with a head injury, stroke or other brain damage and 15% cared for a person with mental illness. Among those of working age, partner-carers were less likely to be employed full-time, or employed at all, than both other carers and non-carers, and those aged 55–64 were less likely to be employed than their younger counterparts.

In 2009, an estimated 288,300 Australian children aged 0–14 had some kind of disability: over 3% of 0–4 year olds, and almost 9% of 5–14 year olds. Of these, 166,700 had a severe or profound "core activity limitation", where they need assistance with regular communication, mobility or self-care tasks. Estimates suggest that about half of all disabled children aged 0–14 have two or more disabilities and almost 7% have four or five. A review of payments to primary parent-carers in Australia found intellectual and learning disabilities (4.3% of all children) and physical/diverse disabilities (4.2%) to be most prevalent, while analysis of the primary disability of service users found that this was "intellectual" for about 30% of people, "physical" for almost 17% and "autism" for about 6%.

The demographics of carers for the youth differ from the old as Australia's introduction of deinstitutionalisation in the 1980s support parents to raise their children at home, including care for most disabled children. Frustrated parent-carers of disabled children have expressed their struggles in Australia that carers of other people do not have, but often live in disadvantaged circumstances such as their incomes are often lower than those of other families: in 2003, 50% of primary carers of disabled children were in the bottom two income quintiles, compared with 34% of non-carers. Primary carers of children with severe disabilities were much more likely (67%) than non-carers (24%) to have a government pension or allowance as their primary source of income.

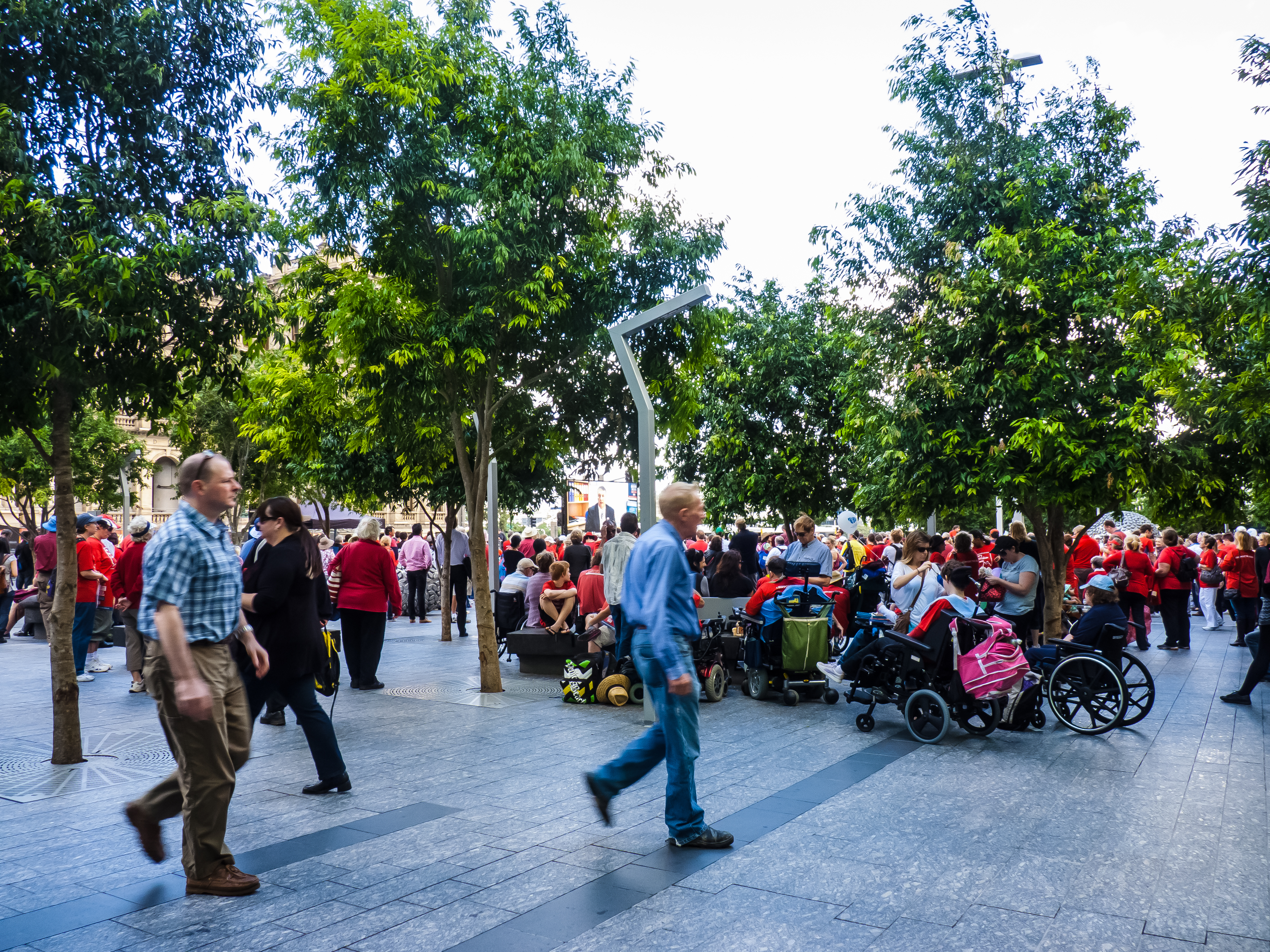
Protests in aid of a National Disability Insurance Scheme.

In response Australian Commonwealth and state/territory governments developed a few initiatives to support all carers including young people with disabilities and their parents. They have developed a few programs that focuses on access to services for disabled children and supported combining paid work and family care for parents to care for their children. In Queensland, the Building Bright Futures Action Plan (2010–13) for children with a disability was developed to prioritize access to early intervention services, build evidence-based support and strengthen the disability services workforce. Another in New South Wales, the Stronger Together Plan (2006–16) is designed to enable children with a disability to grow up in a family and participate in the community, and to support adults with a disability to live in and be part of the community (with services such as respite, therapy, innovative care and family and sibling support). The Commonwealth even developed their own program called Helping Children with Autism package (HCWA) (from 2009) which provides funding for early intervention services such as the access to advisors who provide information on eligibility, funding and services; supported playgroups; new items on the Medicare Benefits Schedule (MBS).

Another initiative was introducing new policies that are more beneficial for carers specifically including the Carer Recognition Act (2010) and the Carer Strategy (2011) because mainstream programs often do not cater for reconciling work and care for parent-carers of disabled children for children with disabilities, which can severely curtail their parents' opportunities for paid employment. The Fair Work Act (2009) was passed for parent-carers to have flexible working arrangements until their disabled child is 18. In 2008, the Commonwealth government began to conduct a major review of Carer Payment for children, with a task-force that included representatives of families of disabled children, carers, non-governmental organisations, academics and clinicians. The review found that because their children did not meet the definition of "profoundly disabled", many parents were ineligible for Carer Payment. It led to a broadening of the eligibility criteria, with 19,000 parent-carers subsequently expected to be newly eligible for the payment.

== Work ==
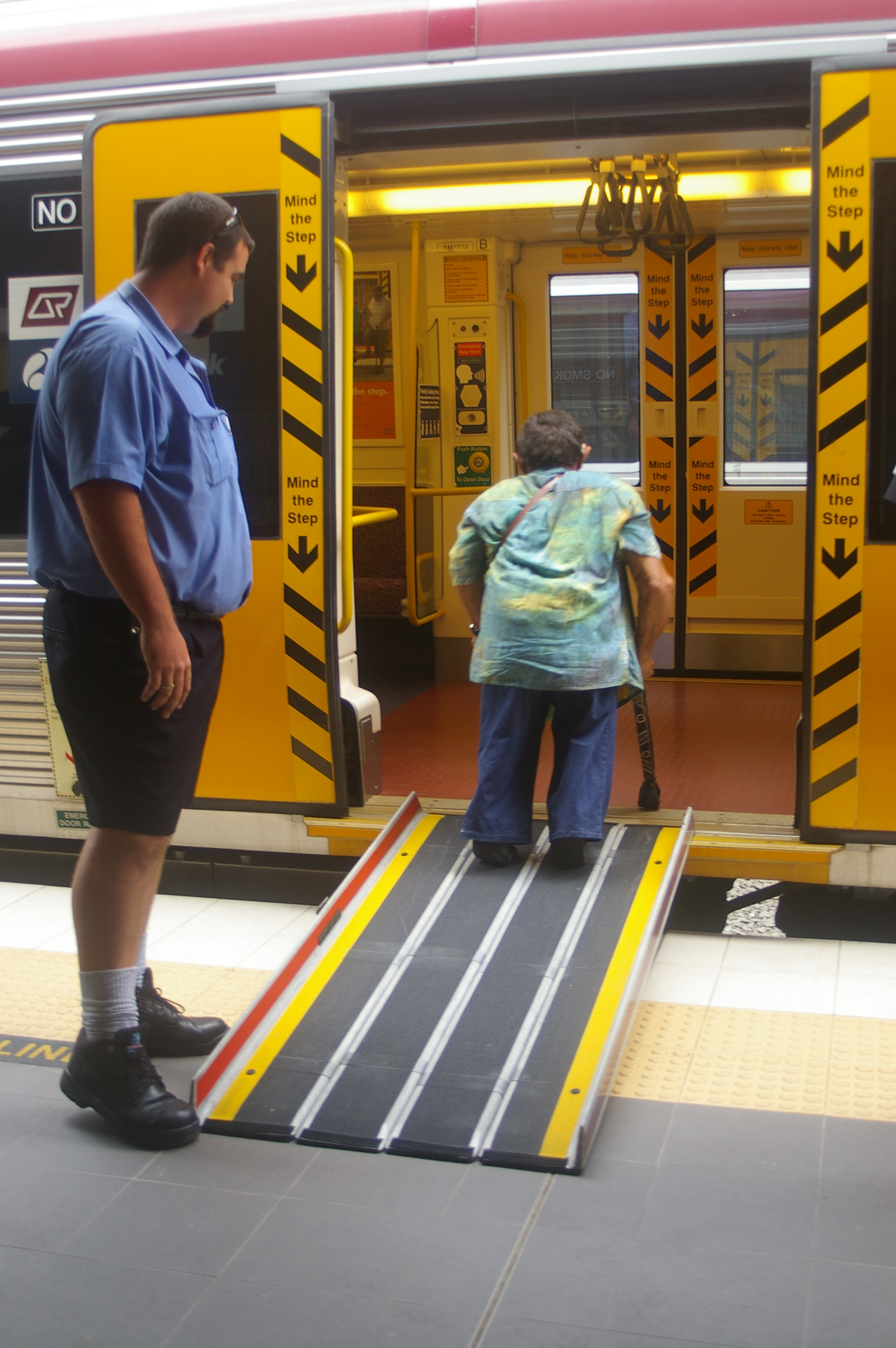
Assistance boarding a train at Roma Street station, Brisbane

In Australia in 2009, over one million working-age people with disability (50%) were in paid employment, comprising 10% of the total Australian workforce. Men with disability (55%) were more likely to be employed than women with disability (45%). Although there have been improvements in anti-discrimination legislation, people with disability are still less likely to be working than other Australians. The labour force participation rate for those aged 15–64 years with disability in 2009 was 54%, much lower than that for those without disability (83%). One of the priority outcomes of the National Disability Strategy 2010–2020 is to "increase access to employment opportunities as a key to improving economic security and personal wellbeing for people with disability..." As of 2012, half of working-age Australians with a disability were employed, whereas for non-disabled working-age Australians, this was 80%.

The disability rate for Australians aged 15–64 years, those of 'prime working age', rose from 15% in 1993 to a peak of 17% in 2003, then returned to 15% in 2009.

Over the sixteen years from 1993 to 2009, the unemployment rate for 15- to 64-year-olds with disability decreased from 17.8% to 7.8%, in line with the similar decline in unemployment for those with no disability (from 12.0% in 1993 to 5.1% in 2009). However, the unemployment rate for people with disability continued to be significantly higher than for those without disability in 2009.

Of those people with disability who were not in the labour force, one fifth (20% or 194,000) had no employment restriction, meaning that it was not their disability which prevented them from working. Difficulties such as access to childcare (22%), were reported as limiting these people's ability to participate in the labour force despite having no employment restrictions. For people without disability who were not in the labour force, other difficulties were reported such as a lack of vacancies or suitable hours (both 11%).

The type of disability that an individual has can affect their likelihood of participating in the labour market. People with sensory or speech impairment had the best labour market outcomes with a participation rate of 54% and an unemployment rate of 7.0%, while people whose disability was psychological had the lowest participation rate (29%), and the highest unemployment rate (19%). People with sensory or speech impairment may be able to benefit from assistive technologies but this is not the case for people with psychological disability such as mental illness. People with mental illness may experience disruption to their work attendance and career due to the episodic nature of their disability.

As with disability type, the severity of a person's disability is reflected in their ability to participate in the labour force. Generally, labour force participation decreases as the severity of disability increases. In 2009, those aged 15–64 years with moderate or mild disability had a participation rate of 53%, while those with profound or severe disability had a labour force participation rate of 31%. This pattern was evident across all types of disability. For example, the participation rate of those with moderate or mild physical restriction was 51%, while those with profound or severe physical restriction had a participation rate of 28%. To see a pattern in unemployment rates, severity and type of disability need to be looked at together. For example, the unemployment rate for people with intellectual disability was high in comparison with other disability groups, regardless of severity. Those with moderate or mild intellectual disability (20%) had a higher unemployment rate than those with moderate or mild physical disability (8.8%). This may partly reflect the unique barriers that people with intellectual disability face in accessing education and work.

Some people with disability experience employment restrictions such as being restricted in the type of job they can do or the number of hours they can work, or needing special assistance in the workplace. People with disability who had an employment restriction were far less likely to be participating in the labour force (46%) than those without an employment restriction (71%). Of the 69% of people with disability who had an employment restriction, two of the most common restrictions were the type of job or the number of hours they could work (51% and 31% respectively). People with profound or severe disability were the most likely to have some kind of employment restriction (92%).

Generally, people with disability who were employed were more likely than people without disability to work part-time (38% and 31% respectively). The number of hours usually worked by people with disability was associated with the severity and type of disability they had. People with profound or severe disability who worked were more likely to work part-time hours than those with less severe disability. Nevertheless, almost half (49%) of those with profound or severe disability who were working, worked full-time. Among the five disability groups, psychological and intellectual disabilities have greater association with fewer working hours. More than a third (35%) of people with psychological disability who worked, usually worked no more than 15 hours, followed by people with intellectual disability (30%). In contrast, about two thirds of employed people with sensory or speech disability (66%) or physical disability (61%) worked full-time.

Almost one fifth (19%) of working-age people with disability who were employed in 2009 worked as professionals, followed by clerical and administrative workers, and technicians and trade workers (both 15%). The distribution of people across different occupations is similar for people with and without disability. However, there was some variation of occupations according to the type of disability. For example, around one third (34%) of employed people with intellectual disability were working as labourers, such as cleaners, in 2009, while one-fifth (20%) of employed people with sensory or speech disability were in professional occupations, such as secondary school teachers. Both people with and without disability had similar distributions across industry groups. Some industries had a higher than average (10%) disability prevalence rate, particularly Agriculture, forestry and fishing (15%) and Transport, postal and warehousing (12%). This may be partly reflective of the older age profile of people in these industries. People with disability who were working were more likely to run their own business (13%), and/or work from home (9%), than employed people without disability (10% and 6% respectively). Such situations may enhance the flexibility of working arrangements, making it easier for people with disability to participate in the labour force.

Among working-age people with disability who were employed, the most commonly reported main source of cash income was wages or salary (77%), much higher than the next most common income sources, government pensions or allowances, and business income (both 9%). Of people with disability who were employed, over one fifth (22%) received some form of government pension or allowance. This was nearly double that of people without disability who were employed and in receipt of a government pension or allowance (12%). People with disability who were working part-time were more likely to receive a government pension or allowance (41%) than those working full-time (10%). The main disability income support, The Disability Support Pension, can provide income to supplement earnings from work.

Employers and disability employment service providers may need to make special arrangements to ensure that employees with disability have a suitable environment in which to work. In 2009, 12% of employed people with disability required some type of special work arrangement such as being provided with special equipment or being allocated different duties. The type of disability influenced whether assistance was needed in the workplace and the kind of assistance required. Employed people with psychological or intellectual disability were likely to require special working arrangements, with nearly one fifth (18% and 16% respectively) receiving assistance, such as a support person to assist or train them on the job. People with sensory or speech disability who were working were less likely to require special working arrangements, with one tenth (9%) receiving special working arrangements. For this disability group, assistance provided took the form of special equipment (48%).

As of 2022, over 40% of Australian managers in a YouGov survey had never hired a person with disability, and almost 1 in 10 admitted they were not open to hiring people with disabilities in the future.

=== Income ===
Since Ronald Henderson's 1975 report into poverty, people with disability have been known to experience poverty in Australia at higher rates than non-disabled people. Disability can affect a person's capacity to participate in the labour force and their ability to earn income. The following 2015 SDAC results relate to people of working age (15 to 64 years) who were living in households. In 2015, around two in five (41.9%) people of working age with disability reported that their main source of cash income was a government pension or allowance, followed by wages or salary (36.5%). Those with a profound limitation were more than twice as likely to report a government pension or allowance as their main source of income (82.8%) than those with a mild limitation (37.2%).

People with disability were more likely to have lower levels of income than those without disability. In 2015, approximately half (49.4%) of people with disability lived in households in the lowest two quintiles for equivalised gross household income, compared with 24.3% of those without disability (excluding those for whom their income was not known). People with disability were also less likely to live in households with incomes in the highest quintile (13.4%) compared to those without disability (26.5%).

Given the smaller proportion of people earning a wage or salary and their greater reliance on government pensions and allowances, it follows that income levels for those with disability would be lower than those without disability. In 2015, the median gross income for a person with disability aged 15 to 64 years was $465 per week, less than half the $950 per week income of a person without disability.

== Sport ==
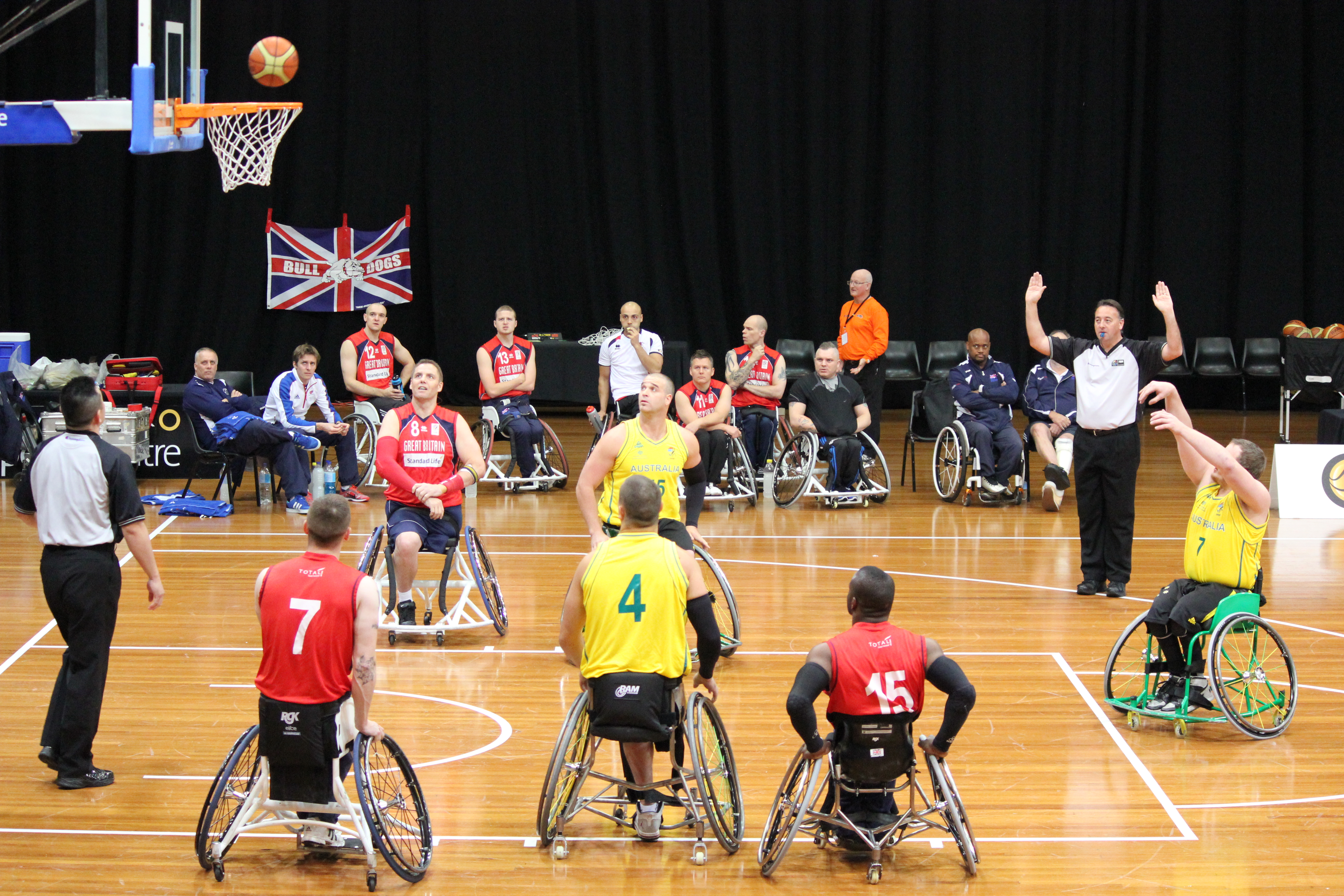
A 2012 wheelchair basketball match

Australian participation in disability sports is lower than in able bodied sports. Public funding for disability sport focuses on the Paralympics and the Australian Paralympic Committee who have a 'Talent Search' program to provide support for potential candidates seeking to enter elite disability sports. Australia's participation at the Paralympics has included sending delegations to the Summer Paralympics since the first games in 1960, and to the Winter Paralympics since 1980.

== Advocacy ==
People with Disability Australia is the national peak disability rights and advocacy organisation.

Since the 1970s people with disability have been involved a number of campaigns regarding deinstutionalisation, funding for independent living and housing, carer support, wage justice, bodily autonomy, and access to transport, buildings and entertainment. Some have been successful in securing improvements and rights while others have attempted to halt cuts and defunding.

Some of the social issues involving disability are:

Cost of assistive technology

Consumers of assistive technology have argued that they are subject to an Australia Tax, which means that assistive equipment is more expensive in Australia than in other comparable countries.

Disabled people killed by carers

A 2018 report found that over the last 15 years, within Australia, a person with disability had been murdered by their intimate carer (a friend or family member) every three months.

Death rate of disabled prisoners

On 16 September 2020, Human Rights Watch revealed in a detailed report that around sixty per cent of prisoners, who died in Western Australian prisons in the past decade, were prisoners with disabilities. The report, titled 'He's Never Coming Back': People with Disabilities Dying in Western Australia's Prisons, reviewed 102 deaths in prison in Western Australia over the last 10 years.

== Disability service providers ==
As of 2012 and 2013, 31% of service providers were in the public sector. As of 2016, there were 2,000 disability service providers in Australia.

== See also ==
- Carers' rights
- Dignity Party (South Australia)
- Graeme Innes
- Human rights in Australia
- Indigenous health in Australia
- National Disability Insurance Scheme
