= Homelessness Action Week =

Canadian awareness campaign

Homelessness Action Week (formerly known as Homelessness Awareness Week) is an annual week-long campaign held in over 20 communities in British Columbia, Canada. In Metro Vancouver, the week is sponsored by the Greater Vancouver Regional Steering Committee on Homelessness.

The first Homelessness Action Week began in 2006 as a way to increase participation and public support for solving homelessness by government, the private sector, communities and individuals. The week promotes initiatives and projects that directly affect communities in a positive way, holding events for and about people who are homeless. It is supported by notable local figures such as former B.C. premier Mike Harcourt, Vancouver Whitecaps president Bob Lenarduzzi, and musician Jim Byrnes.

Homelessness Action Week 2008 has over 20 participating communities throughout B.C. and the Yukon. The week was proclaimed by the provincial government as Homelessness Action Week in 2007 and 2008. The communities participating in the week include: Abbotsford, Metro Vancouver, Prince George, Prince Rupert, Kamloops, Kelowna, Nanaimo, Nelson, Whitehorse, and Victoria. Events include: peaceful demonstrations, discussion forums, food drives, photo exhibitions, films, and service fairs for people who are homeless.

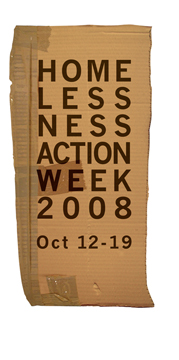

As of 2021 Homeless Action Week is still happening in Vancouver and supports community and grassroots events.

== See also ==
- Homeless Persons' Week (Australia)
- Youth Homelessness Matters Day (Australia)
