= Youth Action =

Youth Action is the peak body organisation for young people and youth services in New South Wales, Australia. Previously known as Youth Action Policy Association (YAPA), the organisation represents 1.4 million young people and the services that support them.

Youth Action undertakes a vast range of activities including policy development, advocacy work and sector support.

== History ==
In the late 1980s there were three youth peak bodies across New South Wales:

- DYSA (Developmental Youth Services Association)
- YACON (Youth Affairs Council of NSW)
- YAA (Youth Accommodation Association)

In 1990 YACON and DYSA amalgamated to form Youth Action and Policy Association (YAPA), while YAA (now YFoundations) continued as a peak for youth accommodation services. In March 2013, the organisation changed its common name from YAPA to Youth Action.

== Organisation ==
The organisation:

1. Responds to social and political agendas relating to young people and the youth services sector
2. Provides proactive leadership and advocacy and shape the agenda on issues affecting young people and youth services
3. Collaborates on issues that affect young people and youth workers
4. Promotes a positive profile in the media and the community of young people and youth services
5. Builds capacity for young people to speak out and take action on issues that affect them
6. Enhances the capacity of the youth services sector to provide high quality services

Youth Action is currently led by Kate Munro who has over 28 years experience in the youth and community services sector, specialising in youth participation, child and human rights, youth development, and systemic advocacy in NGO, local and state government, including Manager - Participation at the Office of the NSW Advocate for Children and Young People. She has been associated with Youth Action for over 20 years, including a term on the Board.

Previous CEO's include, Katie Acheson (5 and a half years). Acheson in 2015 was named the second most influential person in the social sector, by the Impact 25 Awards. and was the Australian Youth Expert for the Australian Youth Development Index 2016. In October 2019 Acheson was named one of The Australian Financial Review's 100 Women of Influence in the Social Enterprise and Not-for-profit category.

== Policy ==
Youth Action regularly conducts research to inform public policy in New South Wales. In 2016 Youth Action partnered with the Australian Research Alliance for Children and Youth (ARACY) to survey young people about the issues they cared about in the lead up to the federal election. The resulting report, Agenda for Action, was widely publicised in state and national media, influencing the conversation about young people in the political sphere.

In 2016 Youth Action was also on the technical advisory committee for the first Australian Youth Development Index. This index analysed the state of youth development across the country, and changes since 2006. It was part of the Commonwealth Youth Programme initiative to increase focus on youth development through presenting and collecting relevant data and complemented the Commonwealth Youth Development Index.

In February 2016 Youth Action submitted to the NSW Government's Blueprint for the domestic and family violence response in Australia. They particularly highlighted the impact of domestic violence on young people's lives, and the need for 'whole of school' approaches to education about domestic violence.

In May 2015 Youth Action proposed an alternative option for affordable housing for young people, based on an already existing international and domestic model of shared housing, known as ‘Homeshare’. Their proposal was widely discussed in the media.

== Media ==
The CEO of Youth Action is regularly interviewed by Australian media for social comment. Aside from commenting on their own policy submissions and research, Youth Action is often called upon to comment on topical, youth-related issues. These issues have included domestic violence, housing affordability, education, countering violent extremism, employment services, drugs and alcohol, health, mental health and welfare.

In 2016, in the lead-up to the federal election, Youth Action was part of a wider media push to encourage young voters to enrol. Shortly after this effort the Australian Electoral Commission announced that there had been a 20% jump in enrolment by young voters.

Youth Action was in the news in April 2016 for their recommendation that laws surrounding sexting be changed, to reflect contemporary common practice. The recommendation was part of their submission to a NSW government Inquiry into the Sexualisation of Children and Young People.

In February 2016 Youth Action provided comment to national media on the issue of housing affordability for young people.

== See also ==
- Yfoundations
