= Waverley Action for Youth Services =

Nonprofit organisation in Sydney, Australia

Waverley Action for Youth Services (WAYS) is a non-profit organisation based in Eastern Suburbs of Sydney, Australia. The organisation provides a range of social support services for children and young people include a youth centre, children's activities, music tuition, alternative education, counselling, employment and training services.

WAYS provides workshops at local schools in areas such as drugs and alcohol, resilience, peer relationships and bullying.

WAYS assists at-risk teens.

== History ==
WAYS was established in 1979, and has been assisting youth (ages 9–25) from Sydney's Eastern, Inner and Southern suburbs. Their services include recreation, education and training, case management, counselling, health promotion and clinical services.

The service was recognised by the NSW Parliament as a notable support service for the community, helping young people for over 35 years.

Russell King is the CEO.

Following allegations of a rape of a young women in the community, Waverley Mayor Sally Betts, sought to introduce a school education program at WAYS intended for girls to minimise “risky behaviour”. The board of WAYS distanced themselves from the Mayor following criticism of the move.

WAYS runs a sexual health clinic for youth. The clinic is located in Bondi Junction.

In 2004, WAYS sought to purchase the old Bondi Police Station to provide emergency accommodation for young people in the Eastern Suburbs, news of the potential sale became publicized after the NSW Police Department revalued the property, making the cost of the sale too high for WAYS.

== See also ==
- Waverley Council
