= People with Disability Australia =

Australian disability rights and advocacy organisation

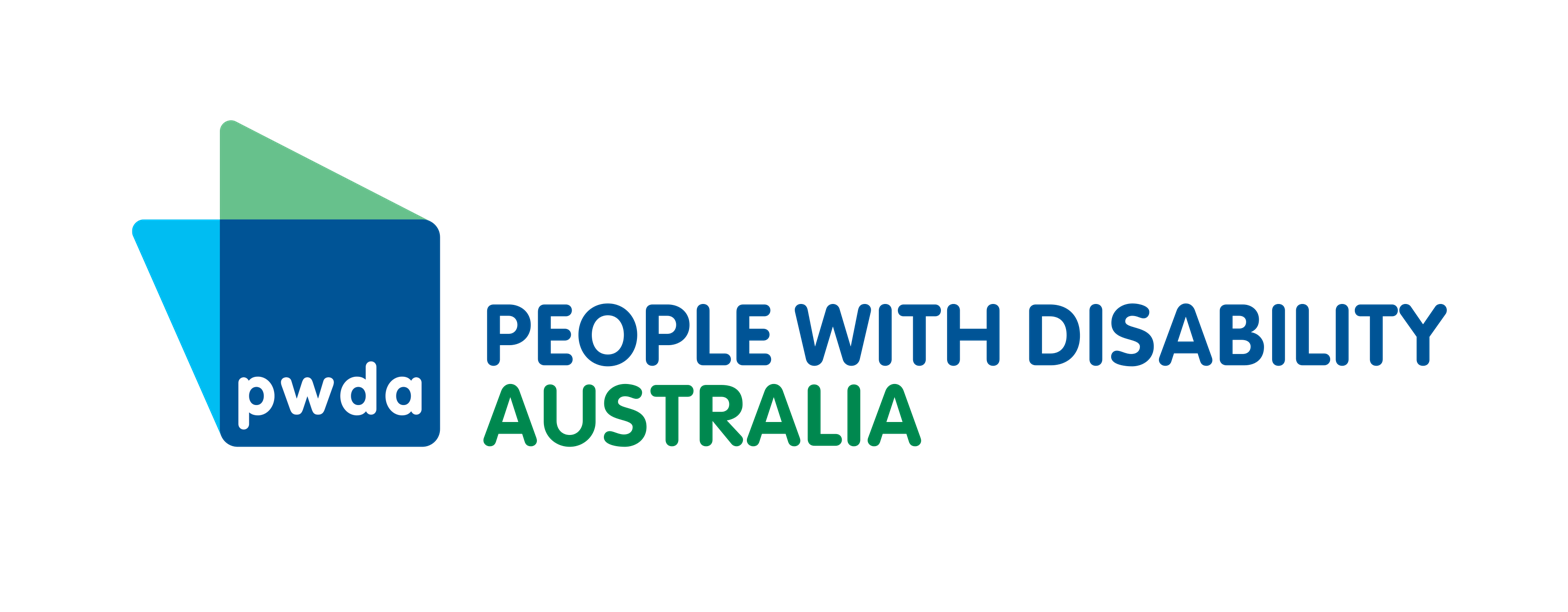
- Abbreviation: PWDA
- Formation: 1980
- Type: NGO
- Purpose: Peak disability rights and advocacy organisation
- Location: Sydney
- Region served: Australia-wide
- President: Trinity Ford
- Website: pwd.org.au

People with Disability Australia (PWDA) is an Australian national peak disability rights and advocacy organisation. Founded in 1980 and based in Surry Hills, Sydney.

PWDA is a Disabled Persons Organisation (DPO), with an elected board of people with disability, a national membership of people with disability and associate membership of people and organisations "committed to the disability rights movement". PWDA is one of the funded national disability representative organisations for people with disability in Australia. Its primary objective is represent the interests of Australian people with disability nationally and globally.

== President ==
A list of former and current president(s) of the PWDA:

- 2002: Wendy Potter
- 2003–2006: Heidi Forrest
- 2007–2008: Robert Farley
- 2009: Vacant
- 2010–2011: Jan Daisley
- 2012–2015: Craig Wallace
- 2016–2017: Bonnie Millen
- 2018–2019: David Abello
- 2020–2022: Samantha Connor
- 2022–2024: Nicole Lee
- 2024–2024: Marayke Jonkers
- 2025–: Trinity Ford

== History and mission ==
PWDA was founded in 1980 as the NSW Handicapped Persons' Union. In 1984, it merged with the New South Wales chapter of Disabled Peoples' International, which was founded in 1981, and became Disabled Peoples International (NSW Branch) or DPINSW. In 1991, the organisations name was changed to People With Disability NSW Inc. (PWDNSW).

In 2002, PWDA's membership approved a repositioning of PWDA as a national disability rights and advocacy organisation. The name was changed to its current name: People with Disability Australia to reflect this new positioning on 21 July 2003. The principal reasons for the change were to position PWDA to undertake work on national policy issues.

Between 2003 and 2006, PWDA played a valuable role in the development of the United Nations Convention on the Rights of Persons with Disabilities (CRPD). It organised consultations both nationally and with members, made submissions, hosted seminars, and supported delegates to attend sessions of the UN Ad Hoc Committee. Through this work PWDA gained Special Consultative Status with the Economic and Social Council of the United Nations.

From 2009 onwards, PWDA continues to participate in monitoring the implementation of the CRPD in Australia, and as a member of the NGO CRPD Shadow Report Project Group. Along with the organisation's national work, PWDA has undertaken international development work in the Pacific since 2004. This non-profit, non-governmental peak organisation has been described as "the national cross disability rights and advocacy organisation run by and for people with disability... [representing] the interests of people with all kinds of disability".

PWDA appeared and gave evidence during the 2019–2020 Australian Disability Royal Commission.

== Controversy ==
In 2020, an online feminist pressure group, 'Mad Fucking Witches' (MFW) were involved in a 'nasty' dispute involving a campaign to remove two sitting PWDA directors over claims of alleged abusive posts on social media. PWDA stated it was an internal matter, irrespective of the complaints under consideration submitted by MFW.The Age reported that "both women [directors] deny they were abusive, but say they were highly critical of postings from the activist group [MFW] involving disabled people". The attempt to remove them did not succeed.

== Activities ==
=== Service provision ===
PWDA provides the following services:

- Rights-related information, advice and referral services for people with disability and their associates
- Short-term individual and group advocacy assistance to people with disability and their associates
- Advocacy for reform around systemic issues that adversely affect people with disability and their associates
- Representation of the sector of interest constituted by people with disability and their associates to government, industry and the non-government sector
- Coordination of the sector of interest constituted by people with disability and their associates
- Disability rights-related research and development around issues of concern to people with disability and their associates

=== Public Advocacy ===
Since its inception in 2013, The NDIS is a key focus of PWDA, with extensive government lobbying and constructive contributions from PWDA and its members. In 2013, Wallace the president at the time said "People with disabilities should be given more choice and control over their funding, so they can purchase the services that suit them".

In 2025, the NDIS has public support, but a poor reputation. PWDA affirming "the community will fight tooth and nail to protect it" and Steph Travers, a 2025 PWDA board director commenting "recent discourse has made her and the community feel like a political football"

They release a non-partisan federal election platform, featuring demands for election commitments related to people with disability from all parties and candidates.

== See also ==
- Disability in Australia
- Dignity Party (South Australia)
- National Disability Insurance Scheme
