= Australian Unemployed Workers' Union =

Australian union

AUWU
- Australian Unemployed Workers' Union
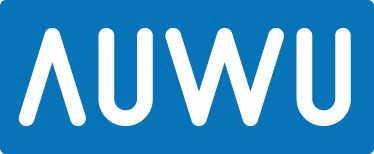
- Founded: 2014
- Headquarters: Melbourne, Victoria
- Location: Australia
- Website: auwu.org.au

The Australian Unemployed Workers' Union (AUWU), is an Australian union representing unemployed, underemployed and unwaged workers, including recipients of welfare payments and services in Australia. The AUWU is a national organisation, with divisions and branches operating in every State/Territory in Australia.

== History and membership ==
The AUWU was founded in 2014 as a grass-roots advocacy group for the rights of unemployed workers. As of 2020, the AUWU has grown to include branches in every state and territory in Australia. The AUWU is reported to have approximately 16,000 members.

AUWU's membership is open to all and free; some voting rights are limited to unemployed and under-employed members. Members upon joining must agree to the AUWU's list of demands, guiding principles and constitution. To its members, the AUWU provides a regularly updated "rights guide" for unemployed/underemployed workers navigating the Social Security system, jobactive system, and the Employment Services Industry, online and in-person telephone support services (including a crisis support hotline for the unemployed). They also provide numerous training sessions, workshops and presentations.

== Activism ==
The AUWU carries out campaigns, produces original research, senate submissions and reports, analyses Australian unemployment, gathers stories of unemployed workers' experiences and runs a regular "Fight Back" podcast, amongst other activities.

== In the media ==
In a June 2017 interview with the Courier-Mail, Greens senator Lee Rhiannon expressed support for the AUWU, and revealed she has donated $300 to the association.

2GB broadcaster Ben Fordham has publicly criticised the union in a statement to news.com.au, claiming it 'coaches people how to dodge responsibilities when it comes to work for the dole or finding a job'. Liberal senator and Minister for Employment Michaelia Cash opined that, "Australian taxpayers and indeed those looking for work would be offended by a 'union' whose sole purpose appears to be keeping members out of gainful employment and encouraging them to shirk their responsibilities," and added that the organisation needs to "take a good hard look at itself." AUWU member Ewen Kloas's response to this criticism was also published by news.com.au. He said, "What we tell people are their rights. When unemployed workers go to employment agencies or to Centrelink and have to jump over the high hurdles and burning hoops just to get their social security and live week to week ... all we do is point them in the direction."

Junkee.com.au reported, in August 2020, that the AUWU is encouraging AUWU members and other unemployed people to respond to the Federal government's reintroduction of mutual obligations for people on JobSeeker and other welfare payments by going on strike, doing so by refusing to engage with job agencies.

In a statement to The New Daily, AUWU spokesperson Kristin O’Connell voiced the AUWU's opposition to any move by the Federal government to cut JobSeeker payments, saying that, "It’s still a poverty payment. Now it’s just above the poverty line."

== See also ==
- Wollongong Out of Workers Union
- Unemployed Councils
- Workers Alliance of America
- National Unemployed Workers' Movement
