= Australian Youth Affairs Coalition =

The Australian Youth Affairs Coalition (AYAC) is the national peak body for young people and the youth sector in Australia. AYAC was founded in 2002 and is supported by a representative board of directors including young people and youth workers.

As the peak body, AYAC advocates for young people and provides assistance to the youth sector through training, networking and professional development opportunities.

== Objectives and vision ==
The organisation's aims are as follows:

- Represent the issues and interests of young people, and the sector that supports them, at national and international levels
- Offer policy advice to government and other organisations on issues that affect young people and the youth sector
- Promote the well-being of young Australians
- Advance the participation of young people in the community
- Support best practice in youth participation
- Take a leadership role within the youth sector
- Encourage and support coordination and cooperation within the sector

AYAC's vision is for an Australia in which young people are informed, empowered, encouraged and supported to participate in their communities. This includes ensuring that:

- Young people who have experienced disadvantage can access programs, services, advice and support to reach their full potential
- Young people participate with energy and enthusiasm in public debate, decision making and political process, creating the change they want to see in Australia
- Young people are supported by a vibrant and well-resourced youth support sector that delivers relevant and meaningful programs and opportunities across Australia
- The Australian youth sector is recognised as leading the way in innovative and effective youth engagement and participation strategies
- The community truly values and welcomes the ideas, opinions and experiences of young people in all spheres of community life.

== Funding ==
In 1998, the Minister for Youth Affairs (the Hon David Kemp MP) announced that the Australian Government would not renew AYPAC's contract but would instead fund the National Youth Roundtable as a way to engage young people. This decision was widely criticised at the time, including by the then Shadow Minister for Youth Affairs (Senator Kate Lundy) who accused the Government of being "incapable of debating issues on an intellectual level, preferring to use the muzzle instead".

In May 2007, the then Shadow Minister for Youth (Tanya Plibersek MP) announced that the ALP would establish a national peak body for youth if elected to government. Once elected to Government at the 2007 Federal Election, the ALP Government funded an initiative in their 2008-09 Budget which was launched in October 2008. At this launch, the Minister for Youth (Kate Ellis MP) announced that AYAC would be funded to the value of $400,000 per year as the peak body for youth affairs in Australia. At the time, the Minister identified AYAC's role as "an independent voice and advocate of young people and the youth sector". The funding was subsequently withdrawn in the Abbott government's first budget.

In 2020, the Morrison government announced that $150,000 would be allocated to AYAC to boost its efforts to underline the issues affecting young people and to encourage wider participation.

== Governance ==
AYAC is governed by a Board of Directors including young people, and representatives from the youth sector across Australia. The work of AYAC is undertaken by a paid executive staff.
