= Yfoundations =

Advocacy group in New South Wales, Australia

Yfoundations is the peak organisation for youth homelessness services in New South Wales, Australia.

== Founding ==
Yfoundations was founded in 1979 by 18 youth homelessness services in New South Wales. The organisation was initially called Youth Refuge Action Group (YRAG) and has changed its name several times over the years, including YRA, YRAA, YAA and Yfoundations (since 2011). The organisation's founding members include Caretakers Cottage, Taldumande Youth Services and Young People's Refuge, the first of the NSW youth refuges.

== People ==
- Michael Coffey, CEO 2002 – June 2017
- Zoe Robinson, CEO November 2017 – August 2019
- Pam Barker, CEO October 2019 – June 2022
- Trish Connolly, CEO July 2022 – November 2024
- John Macmillan, CEO since November 2024

== See also ==
- Homelessness in Australia
- Youth Homelessness Matters Day
- Homelessness NSW
