= Youth Homelessness Matters Day =

Awareness day in Australia

Youth Homelessness Matters Day (YHMD), according to the National Youth Coalition for Housing the 2018 Youth Homelessness Matters day was held on 18 April 2018. YHMD is an annual day which seeks to highlight the issue of youth homelessness in Australia. YHMD is supported by the National Youth Coalition for Housing. NYCH supports and informs groups across the country who wish to inform the community about youth homelessness.

YHMD began in 2005 as an initiative of youth workers from Blue Mountains Youth Initiative (BMYI), a Blue Mountains Region interagency of youth services that work with homeless young people. The Youth homelessness peak of NSW (Yfoundations) was equally concerned regarding the lack of public awareness about young people at risk or experiencing homelessness. Yfoundations was also concerned at the lack of awareness at the political and policy level and the lack of traction on the political/policy agenda.

== Theme in 2010 ==
The theme for the 2010 Youth Homelessness Matters Day was "Countdown- Everyone Counts".

== Theme in 2011 ==
The theme for the 2011 Youth Homelessness Matters day was 'Hide and Seek - the hidden nature of youth homelessness in Australia.

== See also ==
- Homelessness in Australia
- Homeless Persons' Week
- Yfoundations
- Homelessness Action Week (Canada)
