= Homelessness in Australia =

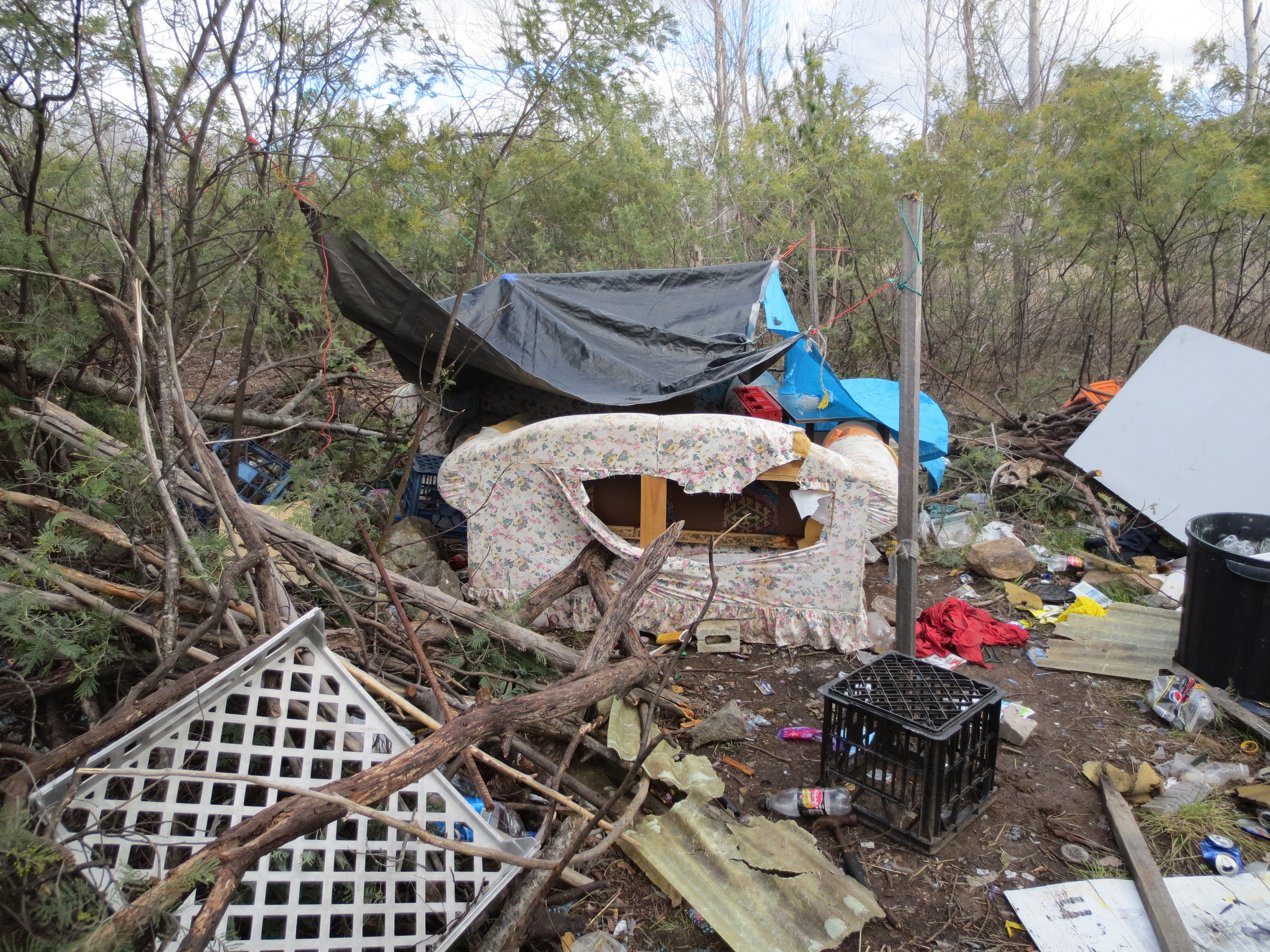
Abandoned homeless shelter Mawson, ACT

Homelessness in Australia is a social issue concerning the number of people in Australia that are considered to be homeless. There are no internationally agreed upon definitions of homelessness, making it difficult to compare levels of homelessness across countries. A majority of people experiencing homelessness long-term in Australia are found in the large cities of Sydney, Melbourne, Brisbane and Perth. It is estimated that on any given night approximately 116,000 people will be homeless and many more are living in insecure housing, "one step away from being homeless". A person who does not obtain any shelter is often described as sleeping "rough".

A person is considered to be homeless in Australia if they:

- do not have access to safe, secure adequate housing, or, if the only housing they have access to damages, or is likely to damage, their health.
- are in circumstances which threaten or adversely affect the adequacy, safety, security, or affordability of their home.
- have no security of tenure – that is, they have no legal right to continued occupation of their living area.

Many homeless people in the central business districts (CBDs) of major cities have become beggars.

People who are homeless in Australia are classified into one of six categories. These are:

- improvised dwellings, tents, sleepers out
- supported accommodation
- people staying with other households
- boarding houses
- other temporary lodgings
- severely overcrowded dwellings.

== 2011 census homelessness figures ==
There were 105,237 people experiencing homelessness in Australia on census night in 2011. This equated to 1 in 200 Australians, and represented an increase of 17% from the 2006 census, with the rate of homelessness increasing from 45 per 10,000 to 49 per 10,000 or an increase in population percentage terms of 0.04%.

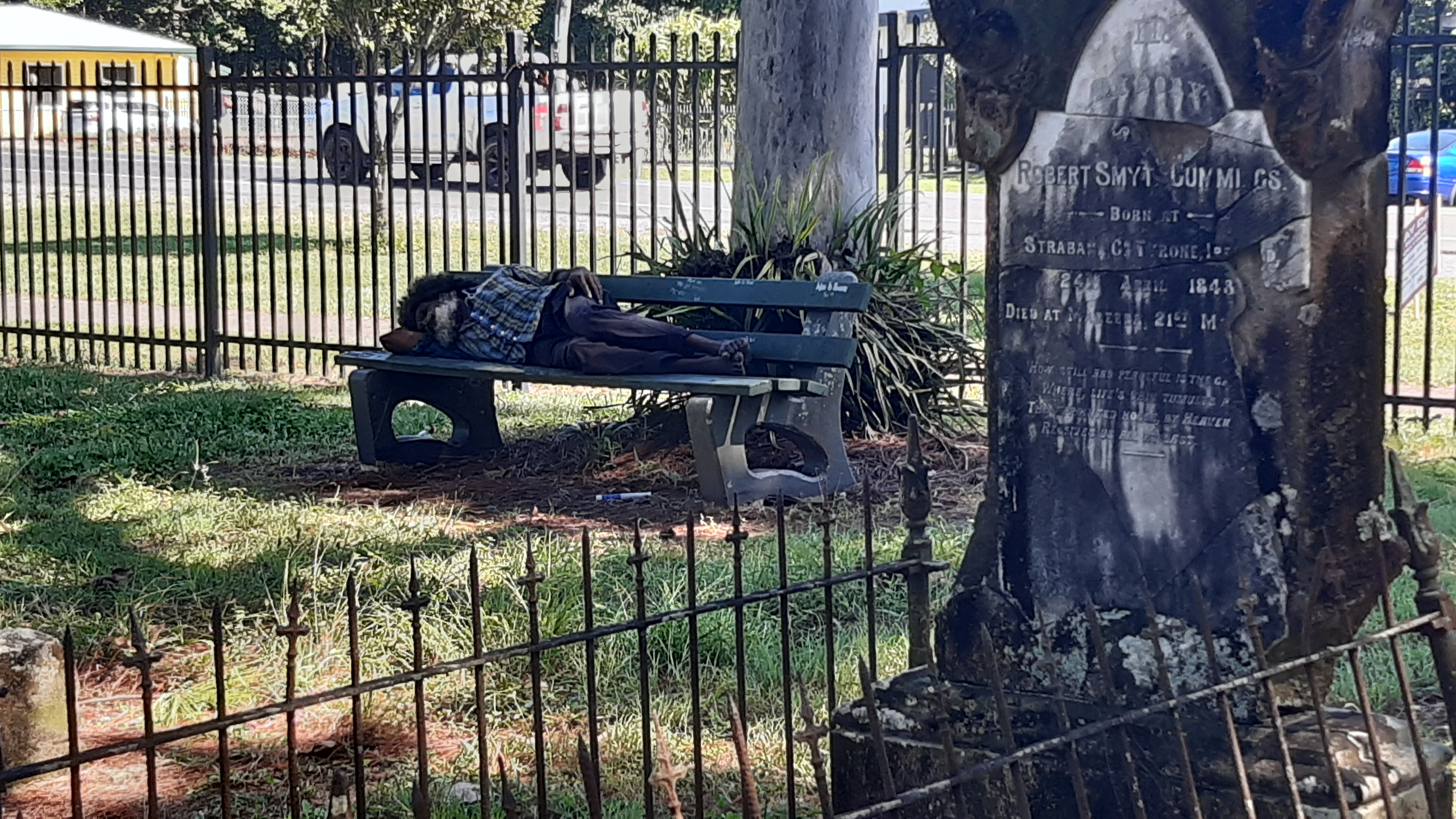
A homeless Aboriginal man sleeps on a bench in the McLeod Street Pioneer Cemetery in Cairns, May 2025

Aboriginal and Torres Strait Islander Australians were over-represented in homelessness data making up 25% (26,744)) of the homeless population, compared to 2.5% of the Australian population.

From 2006 to 2011 the number of people sleeping 'rough' decreased from 9% of the homeless population to 6%. There was also a significant increase (23%) in the number of people staying in homelessness services.

== 2016 census homelessness figures ==
The number of homeless people in Australia jumped by more than 15,000 — or 14 per cent — in the five years to 2016, according to census data. The Australian Bureau of Statistics (ABS) said 116,000 people were homeless on census night in 2016, representing 50 homeless people per 10,000.

== 2021 census homelessness figures ==
In the 2021 census for homeless figures, the number of people experiencing homelessness rose by an approximate 6067 people, an increase of 5.2% since the 2016 census. However the rate of homelessness decreased to 48 people per 10,000 compared to 50 people per 10,000 back in 2016. More Australian males experience homelessness compared to females.

55.9% of people experiencing homelessness on census night were male and 44.1% were female.

== Causes ==
Reason	Percentage
Domestic and family violence	25
Financial difficulties	15
Housing stress	13
Inappropriate or inadequate dwellings	10
Relationship or family breakdown	~6
Housing affordability stress	~5
Source: AIHW Specialist Homelessness; Services data collection (2011–12)

There are many causes of homelessness. The reasons for homelessness are many and varied and each individual's path to homelessness is different and unique. Some other reasons for homelessness are domestic and family violence, alcohol and drug abuse, mental health issues, release from correctional facilities, lack of income and lack of access to affordable housing.

Some of the current homeless population in Australia were previously in large-scale residential institutions for the mentally ill. Deinstitutionalisation of people with mental illnesses began in Australia during the 1980s, and most now live in the general community.

=== Costs ===
It is estimated thata single homeless person costs the Australian government A$30,000 per year.

== Government responses ==
=== The Road Home – Federal Government White Paper ===
The Road Home was launched by former Prime Minister Kevin Rudd in December 2008. This White Paper sets an ambitious target to halve homelessness by 2020 and offer supported accommodation to all rough sleepers who need it. Launching the White Paper, Kevin Rudd said, referring to the 105,000 homeless people in Australia "A country like this should not have this problem, so large and longstanding, without being addressed, it's time we had a decent solution to this problem that has been around for a long time."

The Road Home focuses future effort and investment into three strategies:

1. Turning Off the Tap: Early intervention services to prevent homelessness.
2. Improving and expanding services which aim to end homelessness: Ensuring that Services are more connected, integrated and responsive to achieve sustainable housing, improve social and economic participation and end homelessness for their clients.
3. Breaking the Cycle: Ensuring that people who become homeless are able to quickly move through the crisis system into stable housing with the support they need so that homelessness does not recur.

The Road Home was not implemented following the ousting of the Rudd Government. In 2019 the National Youth Commission published the Report Card which shows only a start to the work required to reduce youth homelessness in Australia.

=== Affordable housing ===
The Council of Australian Governments (COAG)'s National Affordable Housing Agreement (NAHA) subject to provisions of the Intergovernmental Agreement on Federal Financial Relations, defines and measures housing and homelessness services for the Commonwealth and the States and Territories. In 2008 Rudd announced that NAHA would "deliver more longer-term housing for Australians who are homeless, more public and community housing and build and renew run down and overcrowded housing for Indigenous Australians living in remote areas." NAHA's mandate includes a) social housing; assistance to people in the private rental market; support and accommodation for people who are homeless or at risk of homelessness; and home purchase assistance; b) (b) working towards improving coordination across housing related programs to make better use of existing stock and under-utilised Government assets and achieve better integration between housing and human services, including health and disability services; and c) reducing the rate of homelessness."

=== National Partnership Agreement on Homelessness (NPAH) ===
Since 2008, the National Partnership Agreement on Homelessness (NPAH) was formed to allow the Commonwealth Government to provide matching funding to hundreds of homelessness services. In response to the federal funding, states and territories typically match the Commonwealth’s contribution. The total annual NPAH funding is around $250 million per year which is directed to around 800 homelessness services around Australia.

In 2016, homelessness services across Australia began a #SaveNPAH campaign to ensure the Australian Government renews the funding package past 2017. The services stated that without the funding, services would be forced to cut back on essential programs and thousands of Australians would become homeless. The #SaveNPAH campaign succeeded in part, with the Australian government committing to a one year extension of funding.

=== State Government initiatives ===
In South Australia, the State Government of Premier Mike Rann (2002 to 2011) committed substantial funding to a series of initiatives designed to combat homelessness. Advised by Social Inclusion Commissioner David Cappo and the founder of New York's Common Ground program, Rosanne Haggerty, the Rann Government established Common Ground Adelaide building high quality inner city apartments (combined with intensive support) for "rough sleeping" homeless people. The government also funded the Street to Home program and a hospital liaison service designed to assist homeless people who are admitted to the Emergency Departments of Adelaide's major public hospitals. Rather than being released back into homelessness, patients identified as rough sleepers are found accommodation backed by professional support. Common Ground and Street to Home now operate across Australia in other States.

=== Ask Izzy ===
Ask Izzy is a website which connects people experiencing or at risk of homelessness. The website provides links to essential services such as meals, housing, support and counseling. The website was developed by Infoxchange in partnership with Google, REA Group and News Corp.

== Youth homelessness ==
In the mid-1970s, evidence began to emerge that the traditional homelessness population predominantly consisting of middle aged or older males was changing. Instead, younger people began emerging in surveys of the homeless population. This change is attributed to the disproportionately high unemployment rates among young people at the time, inadequate unemployment benefits (particularly for teens who had left school), burgeoning inflation rates and increasing housing and rent costs. This change in demographic increased the demands made on the non-government welfare sector to accommodate homeless youth.

According to the 2006 census, there were over 44,000 young people experiencing homelessness. This means that about 43% of the Australian homeless population are infants, children or youth under the age of 25. A particularly common form of youth homelessness in Australia is "couch surfing" whereby the person experiencing homelessness relies on the support of friends to sleep on their couch or floor. Relationship breakdown and family conflict are often cited as common instigators of youth homelessness.

Youth Homelessness Matters Day is an annual event run across Australia that highlights youth homelessness and associated issues.

=== Youth refuges ===
Youth refuges started appearing in Australia in the 1970s as a community based response to youth homelessness.

- New South Wales – In 1979 eighteen youth refuges in Canberra, including Caretakers Cottage, Taldumande Youth Services, Young People's Refuge among others, founded a peak body organisation to represent themselves to government. The peak body was named the Youth Refuge Action Group (YRAG) (later the name was changed several times over the years, including YRA, YRAA, YAA, and presently, Yfoundations).

== Research ==
=== Post traumatic stress disorder and homelessness ===
A 2006 University of Sydney study of Sydney's homeless found a very high incidence of posttraumatic stress disorder (PTSD) amongst the homeless.

=== The Cost of Youth Homelessness in Australia ===
The Cost of Youth Homelessness in Australia was a longitudinal research study involving three survey waves of 298 young homeless Australians (aged between 15 and 24) and 96 unemployed and disadvantaged youth. The project was funded by the Australian Research Council with industry partners the Salvation Army, Anglicare and Mission Australia. Data collection was undertaken between 2012 and 2015 across Australia. Importantly the project found that over one-third of the homeless youth surveyed reported domestic violence had occurred prior to leaving home and nearly two-thirds had been in some form of out of home (state) care by the time they had turned 18. Half of the homeless youth surveyed reported they had been diagnosed with some form of mental health issue and that they were much more likely to have come into contact with the criminal justice system than the general population and similarly disadvantaged youth.

=== Centre for Social Impact ===
The Centre for Social Impact conducts research based at several Australian universities, focused on understanding social challenges and opportunities.. The focus over the next five years will be on reducing social inequality and understanding and addressing key complex social problems.

== Awareness days ==
- Youth Refuge Week – occurred in the 1980s, was covered in the Australian press, with youth refuges participating in events.
- Youth Homelessness Matters Day – begun in 2005, coordinated by the National Youth Coalition for Housing.
- Homeless Persons' Week – originating from various churches and missions running winter vigils to remember people who had died on the streets, in 2007, Homelessness Australia began coordinating the event as a national awareness week.

== See also ==
- Australian residential rental market
- Poverty in Australia
- Supported Accommodation Assistance Program
- Home ownership in Australia
- Public housing in Australia
- Renters and Housing Union
- Minister for Housing (Australia)
- Minister for Housing (Victoria)
- Minister for Housing (New South Wales)
- Minister for Housing (Western Australia)

Mental health:

- Deinstitutionalisation
- Homelessness and mental health
- Post traumatic stress disorder
- Psychological trauma
