= Peak organisation =

Australian term for a trade association or advocacy group

A peak organisation or peak body is an Australian term for an advocacy group or trade association, an association of industries or groups with allied interests. They are generally established for the purposes of developing standards and processes, or to act on behalf of all members when lobbying government or promoting the interests of the members.

While there is no official granting of Peak Body status, peak bodies are widely accepted as the legitimate "voice" or representative of a profession or industry, as opposed to just a geographic/commercial/cultural/political subset of that profession, as evidenced by requests for media comment and inclusion in government consultations. They often have to present codes of conduct or ethics which can be used in legal cases determining negligence, can conduct industry-focused lobbying, and also can be providers of mandatory industry training.

In the commercial sector they allow competing companies to meet to discuss common issues without the risk of breaching the Competition and Consumer Act 2010 which outlaws collusion between competitors which would affect the operation of a free market.

== Examples ==
Notable examples of Australia-wide organisations include:

- Australian Banking Association
- Australian Breastfeeding Association
- Australian Chamber of Commerce and Industry
- Australian Conservation Foundation
- Australian Council of Social Service
- Australian Council of Trade Unions
- Australian Energy Producers
- Australian Hotels Association
- Australian Industry Group
- Australian Youth Affairs Coalition
- Business Council of Australia
- Coalition of Peaks (also see Australian Indigenous advisory bodies)
- Commercial Radio Australia
- Environmental Health Australia
- FreeTV Australia
- Governance Institute of Australia
- Home Education Association, Australia
- Minerals Council of Australia
- National Academies Forum
- National Farmers Federation
- National LGBTI Health Alliance
- People With Disability Australia
- Pharmaceutical Society of Australia
- Public Relations Institute of Australia
- Scarlet Alliance
- Universities Australia
- Wireless Institute of Australia

Notable examples of Australian state-based organisations include:

- Conservation Council of South Australia
- South Australian Literary Societies' Union
- Chamber of Minerals and Energy of Western Australia

== See also ==
- Ginger group
- Pressure group
- Special interest group
