= Rural health =

Interdisciplinary study of health and health care delivery in rural environments

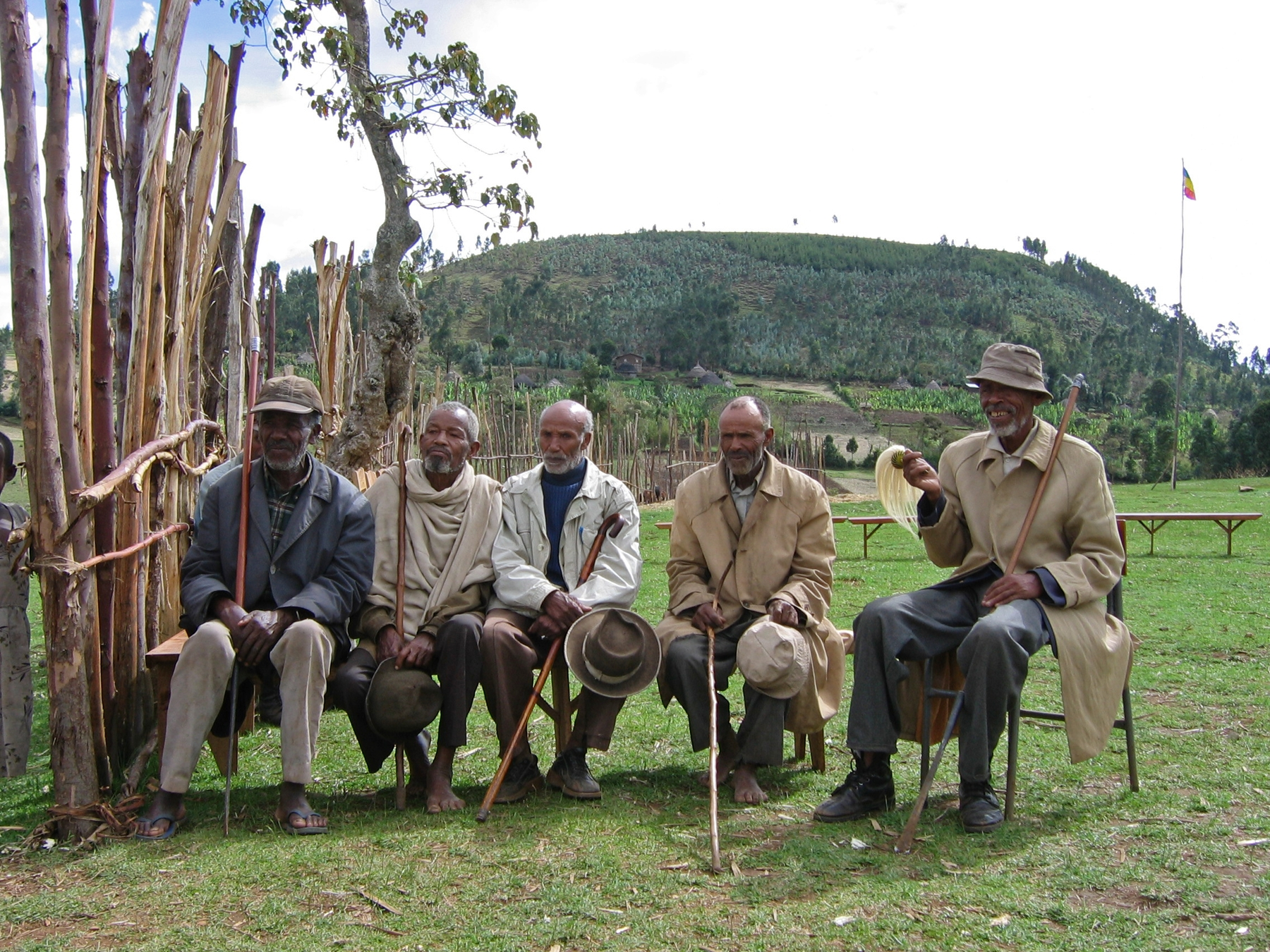
Village elders participate in a training for rural health care workers in Ethiopia.

In medicine, rural health or rural medicine is the interdisciplinary study of health and health care delivery in rural environments. The concept of rural health incorporates many fields, including wilderness medicine, geography, midwifery, nursing, sociology, economics, and telehealth or telemedicine.

Rural populations often experience health disparities and greater barriers in access to healthcare compared to urban populations. Globally, rural populations face increased burdens of noncommunicable diseases such as cardiovascular disease, cancer, diabetes, and chronic obstructive pulmonary disorder, contributing to worse health outcomes and higher mortality rates.

Factors contributing to these health disparities include remote geography, increased rates of health risk behaviors, lower population density, decreased health insurance coverage among the population, lack of health infrastructure, and work force demographics. People living in rural areas also tend to have less education, lower socioeconomic status, and higher rates of alcohol and smoking when compared to their urban counterparts. Additionally, the rate of poverty is higher in rural populations globally, contributing to health disparities due to an inability to access healthy foods, healthcare, and housing.

Many countries have made it a priority to increase funding for research on rural health. These research efforts are designed to help identify the healthcare needs of rural communities and provide policy solutions to ensure those needs are met.

== Definitions ==
There is no international standard for defining rural areas, and standards may vary even within an individual country. The most commonly used methodologies fall into two main camps: population-based factors and geography-based factors. The methodologies used for identifying rural areas include population size, population density, distance from an urban centre, settlement patterns, labor market influences, and postal codes.

The reported number of individuals living in rural areas can vary greatly depending on which set of standards is applied. Canada's rural population can be identified as anywhere from 22% to 38% of the population. In the United States the variation is greater; between 17% and 63% of the population may be identified as living in rural areas. The lack of consensus makes it difficult to identify the number of individuals who are in need of rural healthcare services.

== Life expectancy and mortality ==
Rural areas within the U.S. have been found to have a lower life expectancy than urban areas by approximately 2.4 years. Rural U.S. populations are at a greater risk of mortality due to non-communicable diseases such as heart disease, cancer, chronic lower respiratory disease, and stroke, as well as unintentional injuries such as automobile accidents and opioid overdoses compared to urban populations. In 1999, the age-adjusted death rate was 7% higher in rural areas compared to urban areas. However, by 2019 this difference had widened, with rural areas experiencing a 20% higher death rate compared to in urban areas. There is some evidence to suggest that the gap may be widening as more public health resources are directed away from rural areas towards densely populated urban areas.

These trends are also observed on a global scale, as rural communities are more likely to have lower life expectancies than urban counterparts. Data collected from 174 countries found the maternal mortality rate to be 2.5 times higher in rural areas compared to urban areas. Additionally, the likelihood that a child born in a rural area will die before the age of 5 is 1.7 times higher than a child born in an urban area. Factors contributing to the increased risk of maternal and child mortality include healthcare worker shortages, as well as a lack of health facilities and resources in rural areas.

== Health determinants ==
=== Access to healthcare ===
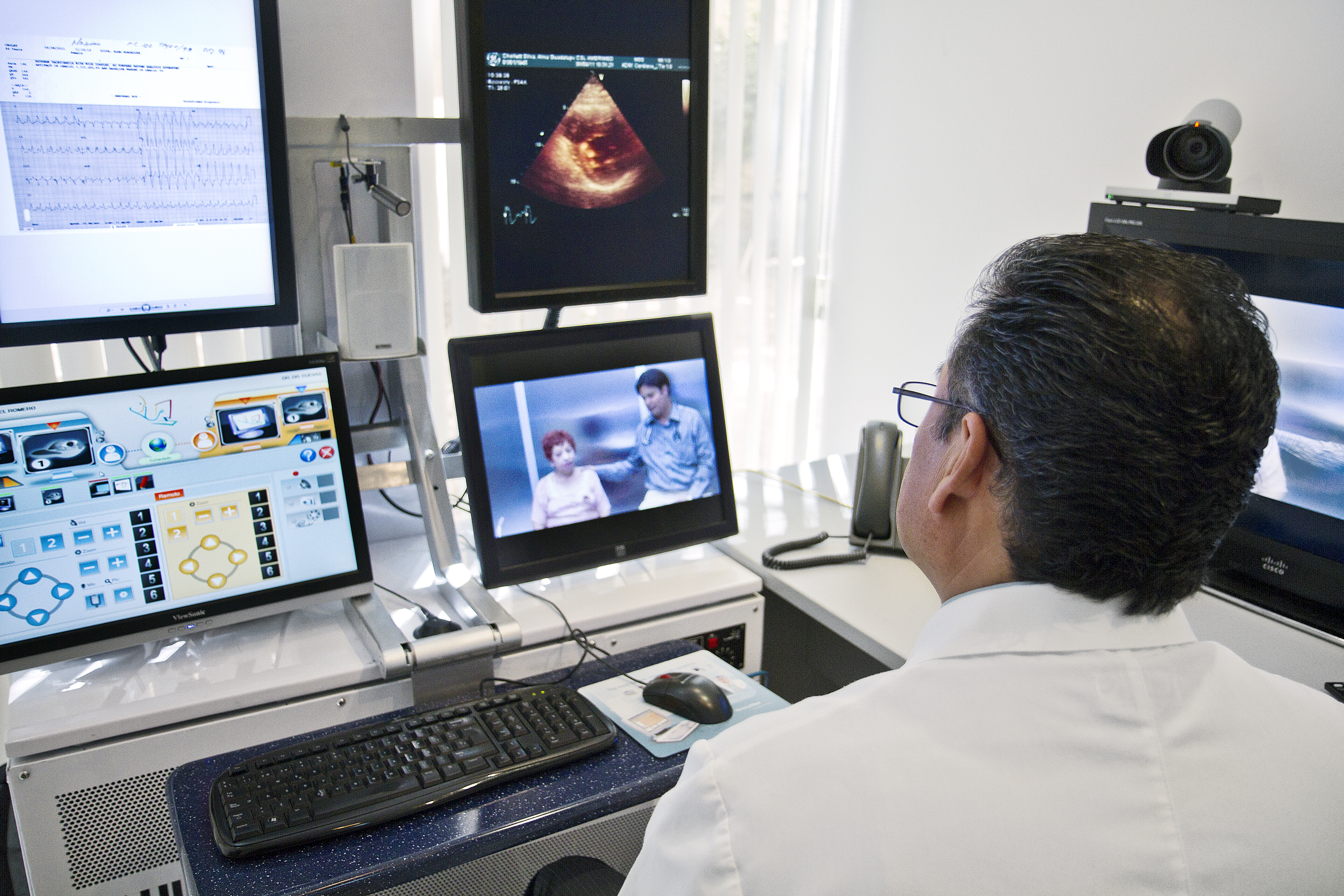
Telemedicine consult: Dr. Juan Manuel Romero, a cardiologist in Sonora, Mexico, engages in a pre-op consultation with Alma Guadalupe Xoletxilva, who is 640 km (400 mi) away in La Paz, Baja California. Telemedicine helps deliver care to patients in rural and remote areas.

People in rural areas generally have less access to healthcare than their urban counterparts. Fewer medical practitioners, mental health programs, and healthcare facilities in these areas often mean less preventative care and longer response times in emergencies. Geographic isolation also creates longer travel times to healthcare facilities, acting as a barrier to accessing care in rural communities. The lack of resources in rural areas have resulted in utilization of telehealth services to improve access to speciality care, as well as mobile preventative care and treatment programs. Teleheath services have the potential to greatly improve access to providers in remote areas, however, barriers such as lack of stable internet access create disparities to accessing this care. There have also been increased efforts to attract health professionals to isolated locations, such as increasing the number of medical students from rural areas and improving financial incentives for rural practices.

Rural communities face healthcare worker shortages that are more than twice as high as urban communities. For example, Canadians living in rural areas have access to half as many physicians (1 per 1,000 residents) and have to travel five times the distance to access these services compared to urban counterparts. There is also a lack of specialist physicians, such as dermatologists or oncologists, in rural communities, resulting in a higher reliance on primary care physicians and emergency rooms for healthcare.

Rural areas, especially in Africa, have greater difficulties in recruiting and retaining qualified and skilled professionals in the healthcare field. In recent years, over 30% physicians from sub-Saharan Africa have left low-income rural areas and moved to higher-income countries due to burnout. This creates further physician shortages and a higher risk of burnout on the physicians that remain in rural communities. In sub-Saharan African countries such as Zambia and Malawi, urban areas have disproportionately more of the countries' skilled physicians, nurses, and midwives despite a majority of the population living in rural areas. In South Africa alone, 43% of the population lives in rural areas, but only 12% of doctors actually practice there. This is similar to the realities in Ghana, which implemented the Community-based Health Planning and Services (CHPS) program, designed to promote community health through preventive and primary care, though the initiative has faced issues due to the uneven distribution of healthcare professionals across all communities.

The gap in services is due, in part, to the focus of funding on higher-population areas. Only 20% of the Chinese government's public health spending went to the rural health system in the 1990s, which served 70% of the Chinese population. In the United States, between 1990 and 2000, 228 rural hospitals closed, leading to a reduction of 8,228 hospital beds. In order to improve health care availability in rural areas, it is important to understand the needs of each community. Each area has unique barriers to accessing care. Local officials, partners, and community members all have a valuable perspective to addressing these issues.

=== Economic stability and employment status ===
The median income of rural households is typically lower than urban households. In 2021, the US Census Bureau reported the median rural household income to be approximately $17,000 lower than urban households. Additionally, there are higher rates of poverty in rural areas compared to urban areas, impacting the ability for rural residents to pay for healthcare services and basic living needs. One contributing factor is that rural areas have less availability of jobs that pay a living wage and offer health benefits.

Industries such as mining, logging, and farming are prevalent in rural areas, which are associated with special health problem of their own. These professions are associated with health complications due to injuries, exposure to toxic chemicals, and exposure to diseases from animal waste. These industries also impact the environmental health in the surrounding community by contaminating their air and water with toxins.

=== Health behaviors ===
Rural residents are more likely to exhibit health risk behaviors than urban residents. There are higher rates of smoking and exposure to second hand smoke, and lower reports of seatbelt use in rural areas compared to urban. Additionally, the rural residents report less leisure-time physical activity and higher caloric consumption, likely contributing to the increased rates of obesity in rural areas. Factors contributing to these behaviors include lack of exercise facilities, lack of nutrition specialists at healthcare facilities, lack of access to affordable healthy foods, and lack of health education. Efforts to encourage the adoption of positive health behaviors in rural areas could help to promote better health outcomes and reduce mortality rates.

=== Physical environment ===
In many countries a lack of critical infrastructure and development in rural areas can impair rural health. The physical isolation of some rural communities coupled with the lack of infrastructure makes it increasingly difficult for those that live in these regions to travel to seek care in clinics and hospitals. Insufficient wastewater treatment, lack of paved roads, and exposure to agricultural chemicals have been identified as additional environmental concerns for those living in rural locations. The Australian Institute of Health and Welfare reports lower water quality and increased crowding of households as factors affecting disease control in rural and remote locations. In hot climates, some scholars are exploring how hybrid solar energy systems could to provide power to different kinds of healthcare equipment. The solar energy solution would dramatically reduce costs in tropical climate countries such as the Philippines as well as utilize their proximity to the equator. This allows for extending business hours in rural health clinics which could better accommodate community members' schedules making services more inclusive and equitable.

=== Educational attainment ===
Access to education is a social determinant of health, as people with higher degrees of education are more likely to live longer and be healthier. Socioeconomic status impacts the likelihood that a child will graduate high school and continue to college. Lower educational attainment is associated with lower income and a higher risk of some chronic conditions, such as heart disease, diabetes, and depression. People from rural communities are more likely to have a lower socioeconomic status and have lower educational attainment compared to urban residents. The percentage of adults who did not graduate high school has decreased from 23.6% to 13.1% in rural areas and from18.8% to 11.4% in urban areas between 1960 and 2019, demonstrating the improvement in educational attainment over time. Despite the progress made, disparities still exist, as the percentage of urban residents with a bachelor's degree or higher in 2019 was 34.7% compared to 21% of rural residents.

The impact of education on health status extends beyond income level, as less education is a risk factor for having low health literacy. Health literacy is the ability for a patient to understand health information and how to manage their health by following instructions from their provider. While living in rural areas is often associated with lower health literacy, research indicates that health literacy is not determined solely by geography. Instead, it is closely related to factors such as education level, income, and age. Studies have shown that rural populations typically have lower health literacy than urban populations, and these differences are often more noticeable in developing countries. People with low health literacy are less likely to have health screening and seek preventative healthcare services, putting them at risk for having a poorer health status and hospitalization. Health education programs in rural areas can be implemented to improve health literacy and health outcomes in these communities.

=== Community engagement ===
Community participation and sustained partnerships between healthcare providers and community members is key to delivering effective rural healthcare. "Community members are important stakeholders, and their perspectives about their health needs and utilization patterns, the health care they can afford to access, and the quality of care they receive, should be viewed as expert evidence when devising rural health care policies." Functional participation involves forming groups to meet existing objectives that are related to a particular goal. Active participation can be integrated through decision-making efforts that are open to all members of the community. Specifically, when improving transportation in rural areas, community members should be consulted to provide their own ideas and have individual roles throughout the project. Support systems should be in place for locals to be involved in critical decision-making as well as voice their opinions with equal stakes without feared backlash. Telemedicine and e-health solutions are also helping outreach to rural patients, in places like the rural Eastern Cape in South Africa. Community participation encourages people living in rural communities to take care of their mental and physical health and empowers them to practice healthy living.

== A renewed focus on rural health worldwide ==
=== National systems ===
Since the mid-1980s, there has been increased attention on the discrepancies in healthcare outcomes between individuals in rural areas and those in urban areas. Since that time there has been increased funding by governments and non-governmental organizations to research rural health, provide needed medical services, and incorporate the needs of rural areas into governmental healthcare policy. Some countries have started rural proofing programs to ensure that the needs of rural communities, including rural health, are incorporated into national policies.

Research centers (such as the Center for Rural and Northern Health Research at Laurentian University, the Center for Rural Health at the University of North Dakota, and the RUPRI Center) and rural health advocacy groups (such as the National Rural Health Association, National Organization of State Offices of Rural Health, and National Rural Health Alliance) have been developed in several nations to inform and combat rural health issues.

In Canada, many provinces have started to decentralize primary care and move towards a more regional approach. The Local Health Integration Network was established in Ontario in 2007 order to address the needs of the many Ontarians living in rural, northern, and remote areas. The Canadian Institute for Health Information has developed the Rural Health Systems Model to support decision-makers and planners with understanding factors that affect rural health system performance, and the Rural Health Services Decision Guide to support decisions surrounding provision of rural health services. In China, a US$50 million pilot project was approved in 2008 to improve public health in rural areas. China is also planning to introduce a national health care system.

=== World Health Organization ===
The World Health Organization (WHO) has done many studies on rural health statistics, showing that urban heath centers score significantly higher in service readiness than rural health centers. Research studies like these exemplify the major problems needing attention in rural health systems and help lead to more impactful improvement projects. Retention of rural health workers remains a major challenge.

The WHO also works on evaluation health system improvements and proposing better health system improvements. An article published in March 2017 highlighted the large improvement to be made in the Solomon Islands health system in a plan laid out by the Ministry of Health and Medical Services, supported by the WHO. These large scale changes move to bring health services needed by the rural population "closer to home."

=== Non-governmental organizations (NGOs) ===
Lack of government intervention in failing health systems has led to the need for NGOs to fill the void in many rural health care systems. NGOs create and participate in rural health projects worldwide.

==== Rural health projects ====
Rural health improvement projects worldwide tend to focus on finding solutions to the three main problems associated with a rural health system: communication systems, transportation of services and goods, and healthcare worker shortages. Due to the lack of access to professional medical care, one approach to improving rural healthcare is distributing health information in an understandable way, such as the Hesperian Health Guides' book, Where There Is No Doctor, and World Hope International's app, mBody Health. These tools provide information on diseases and treatments to help community members navigate their health, however, there is little evidence that this approach improves health outcomes.

Other community based programs focus on promoting health behaviors and increasing utilization of available health resources, such as the mother and infant health program called the Sure Start Project in rural India. An evaluation of the organization showed that community organization surrounding maternal and infant health improvement leads to increased use of health services and improvement in the health of the mother. Similarly, the Consejo de Salud Rural Andino (CSRA) in Bolivia has improved healthcare for rural communities by promoting community education and healthcare clinics. Evaluations of this organization have found that implementation of the CSRA has effectively reduced the under-5 mortality rate in rural Bolivia.

In the United States, the Health Resources and Services Administration funds the Small Rural Hospital Improvement Program (SHIP) to improve the quality of care for hospitals with fewer than 49 beds. Eula Hall founded the Mud Creek Clinic in Grethel, Kentucky, to provide free and reduced-priced healthcare to residents of Appalachia. In Indiana, St. Vincent Health implemented the Rural and Urban Access to Health to enhance access to care for under-served populations, including Hispanic migrant workers. As of December 2012, the program had facilitated more than 78,000 referrals to care and enabled the distribution of US$43.7 million worth of free or reduced-cost prescription drugs. Owing to the challenges of providing rural healthcare services worldwide, the nonprofit group Remote Area Medical (RAM) began as an effort to provide care in third-world nations but now provide services primarily in the US.

In 2002, NGOs "provided 40 percent of clinical care needs, 27 percent of hospital beds and 35 percent of outpatient services" for people in Ghana. The conditions of the Ghanaian Healthcare system was dire during the early 80s, due to a lack of supplies and trained healthcare professionals. Structural adjustment policies led to a significant increase in the cost of health services. NGOs, like Oxfam, are rebalancing the brain drain that remaining healthcare professionals feel, as well as provide human capital to provide necessary health services to the Ghanaian people.

In Ecuador, organizations such as the Child Family Health International (CFHI) promote the implementation of medical pluralism by advancing knowledge of traditional medicine as practiced by Indigenous peoples in a Westernizing country. Medical pluralism arises as a deliberate approach to resolving the tension between urban and rural health, manifesting in the practice of integrative medicine. There are ongoing efforts to implement this system regionally, particularly in Ecuador. It accomplishes the mission of raising awareness of more adequate healthcare systems by immersing participants (including health care practitioners and student volunteers) in programs, both in-person and virtually, rooted in community involvement and providing glimpses into healthcare systems in vastly distinct areas of the nation. Research examines the role of NGOs in facilitating spaces, or "arenas," to spotlight the importance of traditional medicine and medical pluralism; such "arenas" facilitate a necessary medical dialogue about healthcare and provide a space to hear the voices of marginalized communities. CFHI's efforts are supporting Ecuador's implementation of an integrated system that includes alternative medicine. The process of doing so is, however, challenged by four main obstacles. These four obstacles include "organizational culture", "financial viability", "patient experience and physical space" and, lastly, "credentialing". The obstacles continue to challenge the ongoing work of CFHI and other NGO's as they aim to establish a healthcare system that represents the ethnic diversity of the nation.

In Peru, the presence of key organizations such as USAID, PIH, UNICEF, and other local NGOs spearheads efforts to establish a system suited to the country's diverse population. As governments continue to function under the assumption that communities have access to the same resources and live under the same conditions and sets of exposures, their support of Westernized modes of healthcare are inadequate at meeting the varying needs communities and individuals. These systems overgeneralize the needs of the populations and perpetuate harmful cycles by believing that medical practices and procedures can apply to anyone regardless of their environment, socioeconomic status, and color of their skin, when reality proves otherwise. Such systemic failures contribute to a reliance on external NGOs to promote a more equitable healthcare system.

In the Philippines, Child and Family Health International (CFHI) is a 501(c)3 nonprofit organization that works in global health in Quezon, Lubang, and Romblon, focusing on primary care and health justice by providing health services and promoting health education. The Philippines program works through urban and rural clinics/health stations, respectively in Manila and the villages on remote islands known as geographically isolated disadvantaged areas. Their main goal to achieve health equity and social justice is carried out through the leadership of local Filipinos and partnerships with community groups. Although universal healthcare is in place in the Philippines, CFHI addresses persisting inequities and disparities in rural and low-income communities.

===== Telemedicine and rural health =====
For residents of rural areas, the lengthy travel time and distance to larger, more developed urban and metropolitan health centers present significant restrictions on access to essential healthcare services. Telemedicine has been proposed as a way to overcome transportation barriers for patients and health care providers in rural and geographically isolated areas. Telemedicine uses electronic information and telecommunication technologies such as video calls to support long-distance healthcare and clinical relationships. Telemedicine provides clinical, educational, and administrative benefits for rural areas that have access to these technological outlets.

Telemedicine eases the burden of clinical services by the utilization of electronic technology in the direct interaction between health care providers, such as primary and specialist health providers, nurses, and technologists, and patients in the diagnosis, treatment, and management of diseases and illnesses. For example, if a rural hospital does not have a physician on duty, they may be able to use telemedicine systems to get help from a physician in another location during a medical emergency.

The advantage of Telemedicine for educational services includes the delivery of healthcare-related lectures and workshops via video and teleconferencing, practical simulations, and webcasting. In rural communities, medical professionals may utilize pre-recorded lectures for medical or healthcare students at remote sites. Also, healthcare practitioners in urban and metropolitan areas may utilize teleconferences and diagnostic simulations to assist understaffed healthcare centers in rural communities in diagnosing and treating patients from a distance. In a study of rural Queensland health systems, more developed urban health centers used video conferencing to educate rural physicians on treatment and diagnostic advancements for breast and prostate cancer, as well as various skin disorders, such as eczema and chronic irritations.

Telemedicine may offer administrative benefits to rural areas. Not only does telemedicine aid in the collaboration among health providers concerning the utilization of electronic medical records, but Telemedicine may offer benefits for interviewing medical professionals in remote areas for position vacancies and the transmission of necessary operation-related information between rural health systems and larger, more developed healthcare systems.

While telehealth services have improved access to care, challenges remain in providing this care in rural areas. Many rural communities are not equipped with internet connection or technology necessary for a patient to access telehealth services within their home. A survey conducted in 2019 found that people living in rural areas are twice as likely not to have access to the internet connection than urban counterparts. Additionally, lack of internet access was more prevalent among the elderly population and within racial and ethnic minority communities, which could contribute to the existing disparities in accessing care.

== COVID-19 pandemic impacts on rural health ==
=== Economics ===
The pandemic of coronavirus which began in 2019 had serious negative impacts on people around the globe, from financial and mental health troubles to long term disability and death. However, most of the data and statistics presented in the news was collected in urban areas. Before the pandemic, people in rural areas were already struggling with low incomes and low social mobility. During the pandemic, in order to minimize the spread of the virus, many businesses were temporarily closed. On one hand, rural people were actually more likely to keep working than urban people. They were more likely to be essential workers, often in agricultural jobs, growing and harvesting food. However, the closures in urban and suburban areas eventually impacted the selling prices of goods produced in rural areas.

In a study done in Italy, they found that the individuals in the rural areas were less likely to be exposed to the virus because of the smaller population sizes. In these areas the residents live far away from one another. Their social interactions were already limited before the pandemic began. The study indicated that taking advantage of the distance can help reduce the spread. Spending time and money to revitalize rural areas can help form a more sustainable model of better using local resources to help aid in any future incidences.

=== Following health recommendations ===
The individuals living in the rural communities are also less likely to follow prevention behaviors that were recommended. Compared to the 84.55% of urban residents who wore masks, only 73.65% of rural residents did. Wearing masks weren't the only preventative measures that rural residents didn't do as often. They also were less likely to sanitize their living spaces, social distance, and work from home. Once the COVID-19 vaccine was created, the individuals in rural communities were hesitant to get them. Already, rural residents were less likely to get vaccines than those in urban areas. A survey done by the CDC in 2018 showed that rural residents were 18% less likely to get the HPV vaccine and 20% less likely to get the Meningococcal conjugate vaccine than urban residents

=== Health care ===
The health care in general in rural areas has always been struggling. The lack of health care providers has made it difficult for residents to get the care that they might need without going to the big city. With the COVID-19 outbreak, more medical professionals were needed and more equipments and regulations were required. Rural communities have a higher percentage of an older population and they are more susceptible to the virus. Finding ways and people to care for them when they got sick became even more difficult. Rural communities also tend to have a lower rates of health literacy. Health literacy is "...an individuals' ability to access health information, to understand it, and to apply it in ways that promote good health. This makes it harder to protect individuals when they can't effectively communicate with their health care providers.

== Health disparities in United States rural populations ==
=== Spatial disparities in health ===
While the definition of rurality is debated, spatially related disparities are a prominent health problem. Rural sociologists have considered the importance of the urban-rural (spatial) continuum for some time. In the United States, the field of "rural sociology" is inherently based on the assumption that generalizations made about urban populations are not able to be applied to rural ones. Linda Lobao, a prominent rural sociologist, states, "Rural populations were argued to be fundamentally different in their social organization, norms, values, and a host of other attributes." In a paper published in Rural Sociology from 1942, Dorn shares his concerns about U.S. disparities of infant and maternal mortality rates and what he refers to as "sickness (morbidity) rates," juxtaposed with the relatively lower number of physicians and hospitals in the rural areas. He surmises that the "typical" public health activities have exclusively focused on sanitation and controlling communicable disease leaves little to no money for direct medical care. Recent research indicates that rural health access challenges extend to pets, as well.

=== Rural residence as a social determinant of health ===
More recently, public health has also identified spatial disparities as a key component of inequity. Lutfiyya et al. contend that rurality is a root or fundamental social determinant of health. Social determinants of health such as poverty, unequal access to healthcare, education deficits, stigma, and racism are all contributing factors to health inequalities, according to the CDC. Research on "place-based" determinants have historically pointed towards urbanization (e.g., redlining, gentrification) but health disparities also persist in rural areas as well. For example, 20% of the population in the United States is considered rural, but only 9% of physicians serve rural communities, which points to unequal access to healthcare. Cosby et al. refers to the differences in mortality and morbidity between urban and rural residents as the "rural mortality penalty."

Lutfiyya et al. discuss the introduction to the theory of fundamental causes of health and mortality by Link and Phelan and its important omission of rurality and space. While socioeconomic status is fundamentally understood to be a persistent driver of health inequity, this concept was not expanded to include root causes spurring the socioeconomic disparities. Using the four features which characterize a fundamental social cause of health, Lutfiyya et al. demonstrate that rural residency is a root cause of health inequities. The aforementioned four characteristics are: "(1) it influences multiple disease or health outcomes; (2) it affects these outcomes through multiple risk factors; (3) it impacts access to resources that may be used to either avoid risks or minimize the consequence of disease; and (4) the association between the fundamental cause and health is reproduced over time through the replacement of intervening mechanisms."

=== Nuances of US rural populations ===
About 14% of the US population lives in a designated rural area, which is about 46.1 million people. Despite assumptions about the homogeneity of rural populations in the U.S., the rural population at large varies greatly amongst itself and between the urban and suburban populations. For the first time in U.S. census history, individuals 65 and older made up more than 20% of the rural population in 2021. For metropolitan areas in 2021, people 65 and older only made up 16% of the population. Throughout the decade of 2010–20, 65 years and older population in rural areas grew by 22%.

While the rural workforce has become more racially and ethnically diverse than previous years, it is still less diverse than urban populations. Towne et al. found racial differences in health outcomes. For example, white and Black rural residents were less likely to report being in good or excellent health when compared to their urban colleagues. Rural Black residents were less likely to have cholesterol and cervical cancer screenings when compared to their urban counterparts. Another study found that white and Black rural residents were more vulnerable to higher mortality rates. Another study found that "place" (rurality) influenced greater mortality across all racial and ethnic groups. When compared to urban subpopulations, rural white residents had a 13% increased chance of mortality, rural Black residents had an 8% increased chance of mortality, and rural American Indian/Alaskan Natives had an 162% increased chance of mortality.

Similar compounded disparities affect U.S. military veterans living in rural areas, who make up roughly a quarter of the U.S. veteran population. A 2025 national study found that rural veterans from minoritized racial and ethnic groups reported significantly greater difficulties accessing physical, mental, and social care services than non-minority rural veterans, and that higher numbers of mental health conditions correlated with greater barriers to care.

=== Disease prevalence in US rural areas ===
==== Coronary heart disease ====
Taylor writes about some of the disparities in disease prevalence comparing rural and urban residents. She identifies several areas of particular note, including heart disease, unintentional injuries, and cancer. Coronary heart disease (CHD) is the leading cause of death in the United States. CHD mortality is more prevalent among rural men and women compared to their urban counterparts. For rural residents, the unexpected excess deaths from CHS was almost 43% for individuals younger than 80 years old, compared to 27.8% for urban residents between 1999 and 2014. Taylor notes that while mortality caused by CHD have declined overall, the decrease was tied to urbanization levels.

Past research has found that there are greater distances to healthcare centers, healthcare provider shortages, and greater lack of adherence to healthy behaviors, as well as lower self-efficacy for self-management among heart failure patients. While physical activity improves cardiac health, physical inactivity and obesity are greater in rural areas. Depression is also a critical risk factor for heart disease and is associated with elevated morbidity and mortality risk for CHD among rural populations.

==== Unintentional injuries ====
Taylor also discusses unintentional injuries as a broad category that is more prevalent among rural populations than urban ones. In particular, injuries tied to poisonings, transportation, and falls were the top three causes for unintentional injuries causing death among rural groups. Taylor reports that mortality rates for unintentional injuries between 1999 and 2014 surpassed urban counties by 50%. In particular, opioid misuse and deaths accounted for a large portion of these differences. Further, the age-adjusted rate of drug overdose deaths increased by 31% from 2019 to 2020. Related to healthcare disparities, rural patients face inadequate access to drug treatment facilities and often emergency medical ambulatory services did not have the appropriate medical supplies to treat individuals who overdosed at the site of an emergency. Additionally, ambulatory services will often have to travel farther to attend to or transport patients compared to their urban counterparts, which could have grave impacts on a patient's status if time to treatment is influential on their odds of recovery.

According to the CDC, deaths related to motor vehicle crashes are 3-10 times higher in rural areas than urban ones, depending on their region. Specifically, fatalities from crashes was relatively higher in rural areas than urban ones in 2015 (48% vs. 45%). Relatedly, seatbelt use is lower for rural divers, with 61% of drivers and passengers involved in fatal crashes in rural counties did not have their seat belts on at the time of the crash. Compared to urban drivers, drivers in rural areas who encountered a fatal crash and were killed at the scene was 61% (compared to 33%).

==== Cancer ====
The incidence rates for breast, prostate, lung, colorectal, and cervix cancers were higher among rural residents. The death rates for those who have those cancers are also higher in rural areas than urban areas. For example, lung cancer has 20% higher mortality rate in rural areas versus metropolitan areas. Further, while overall cancer incidence was lower among rural individuals, the mortality cancer rates for rural populations outpaced that of their urban counterparts. Cancer mortality rates have been declining, however, this decline has been much slower for rural residents. Taylor notes that risk factors related to cancers of the lung, colon, rectum, prostate, cervix, oral cavity, and pharynx can be modified. For example, rural residents are more likely to be obese, smoke, be exposed to secondhand smoke, lack of physical activity, and be exposed to UV rays. Singh et al. found that increases in lung cancer mortality and the degree of rurality were consistent with higher risk factors.

=== Healthcare disparities in the United States ===
Rural populations not only experience greater mortality and morbidity in the areas mentioned above, but they also encounter healthcare disparities, which are defined as, "differences in access to or availability of medical facilities and services and variation in rates of disease occurrence and disabilities between population groups defined by socioeconomic characteristics such as age, ethnicity, economic resources, or gender and populations identified geographically." Centers for Medicare & Medicaid Services report that only 12% of physicians practice in rural areas, despite 61% of "health professional shortage areas" being located in rural areas. Further, specialty and subspecialty services are less likely to be offered in rural areas. A University of Minnesota report found that of the rural health clinic staff members surveyed, 64% of them reported difficulty finding specialists for patient referral. While telehealth services have been a safeguard for patient living in rural areas. However, broadband and computer access can be critical limitations for those without stable or consistent access.

=== Physician Perspective ===
According to physicians working in rural communities, healthcare disparities are worsened by a combination of provider availability, geographic, infrastructure, and financial barriers. In a study of primary care providers in Pennsylvania, the identified challenges included long travel distances, insurance, and cost restrictions for patients. Providers also described difficulties in recruiting and retaining physicians, particularly specialists, which led to increased workloads and burnout. Another study of physicians from a rural area of Montana found that proper treatment is frequently hindered by cultural differences between patients and providers, poor communication, and limited resources, further complicating care. The studies noted that expanding Telehealth services and increasing the use of advanced practice providers could improve care and help address some of these rural healthcare inequities. Continued policy support and efforts to attract and keep physicians in rural areas are needed to ensure these potential solutions can make a difference.

== See also ==
- Rural and Isolated Practice Registered Nurses
- Rural Health Care in Australia
- Rurality
- Rural Area
- Landarzt
- Medical deserts in the United States
- Community health
