= Rural health care in Australia =

Rural health care in Australia involves the delivery of health services by private, community and public hospitals in areas classified as rural and remote. Researchers note that the health of those living in rural areas is quantitatively and qualitatively different to those living in major metropolitan areas. These differences include often significant gaps in service delivery, accessibility and lower health outcomes.

Rural areas and those who live in them are often understood as living in a spatially, economically, socially and culturally distinct group, although there are criticisms of this perspective. Despite the questions about the framing of rural and remote areas and health services as 'other' to the metropolitan norm or majority, the framing does "highlight a serious social and equity issue," particularly the gap in access and health outcomes for rural and remote populations.

== Rural and remote health care ==
Rural and remote areas of Australia are classified according to a number of different schemes in relation to health care services and reporting.

Rural areas are classified by the Australian Institute of Health and Welfare as those extending from large rural centres (urban centre population 25,000–99,999) through to rural areas with an urban centre population of less than 10,000. Remote areas are classified as remote centres (urban centre population > 4,999) through to those areas with less than 5,000 inhabitants. The Commonwealth Department of Health utilises a similar classification structure called the Australian Standard Geographical Classification – Remoteness Area which was created by the Australian Bureau of Statistics. Alongside its 'Districts of Workforce Shortage' data, the Department provides interactive mapping of the country.

International medical graduates (IMGs) constitute a significant proportion of the rural and remote medical workforce in Australia. Rural and remote areas experience substantially lower ratios of medical practitioners per population compared to major cities. The Area of Need framework, administered through state and territory health departments, enables the employment of IMGs under supervised limited registration to address critical medical workforce gaps, particularly in Modified Monash Model categories 4 to 7 locations. State health services including Western Australian Country Health Service, NT Health, and Queensland Health actively recruit IMGs to fill rural and remote medical officer positions under this framework.

Primary Health Care (PHC) is defined by the World Health Organization as:

"...essential health care based on practical, scientifically sound and socially acceptable methods and technology made universally accessible to individuals and families in the community through their full participation and at a cost that the community and country can afford to maintain at every stage of their development in the spirit of self-reliance and self-determination."

Experts agreed that the core primary care services which should be available to those living in rural and remote communities included care of the sick and injured, mental health, maternal/child health, allied health, sexual/reproductive health, rehabilitation, oral/dental health and public health/illness prevention. That these communities do not have exactly same access to health and medical services - particularly specialist and rarely used services – located in metropolitan communities should not matter if they are able to readily access high quality primary health care services. Research shows that access to this basket of essential primary health care services is not adequate in rural and remote communities.

The relationship between primary health care provision and improved health outcomes is supported by "compelling international evidence". Australians who live in rural and remote areas experience have poorer access to primary health care services than those living in metropolitan areas.

Some challenges for delivering high quality primary health care services in rural and remote locations include the need for alternative models and approaches to delivering services. Service models used in rural and remote primary health care in Australia include discrete services, integrated services, comprehensive primary health care, outreach models and virtual outreach models.

The Royal Flying Doctor Service provides both emergency and primary health care in rural and regional Australia using aircraft.

Heart of Australia provides specialist cardiac and respiratory investigation and treatment services in rural and regional Queensland using specially-equipped large trucks.

== Statistics ==
The Australian Institute of Health and Welfare (AIHW) provides statistical and other data relating to rural and remote health system performance, health status and determinants of health.

In recent reports, the AIHW noted findings that "compared with those in Major Cities, people in regional and remote areas were less likely to report very good or excellent health", with life expectancy decreasing with increasing remoteness: "[c]ompared with Major Cities, the life expectancy in regional areas is 1–2 years lower and in remote areas is up to 7 years lower." It was also noted that Aboriginal and Torres Strait Islander peoples experienced worse health than non-Indigenous Australians.

== Rural health policy ==
Rural health care policy is driven by a combination of Commonwealth (federal), state or territory and local government. The Australian Health Ministers Advisory Council (AHMAC) Rural Health Standing Committee published a 'National Strategic Framework for Rural and Remote Health' in 2012. This document is an agreed statement made by Health Ministers of the Commonwealth, States and the Northern Territory to identify systemic issues which require government attention and to guide future government action. The agreed statement included a 'vision' that "[p]eople in rural and remote Australia are as healthy as other Australians." It also identified access, service models and models of care, health workforce, collaborative partnership and planning at a local level and strong leadership, governance, transparency and performance as its five goals and outcome areas.

Recent statements by the National Rural Health Alliance, argue that the Commonwealth Government's introduction of a co-payment for Medicare funded primary care services will compound the already poorer access to general practitioners which rural and remote populations already experience. In a statement on the first proposal, it opposed the major policy change arguing that the consequences for access to primary care in rural areas would "include higher rates of potentially preventable hospitalisations."

== Critical literature ==
The definition of 'rural health' has been criticised by researchers and health practitioners who question why the phrase ‘rural’ is used. For them, "it implies a unified, fixed and identifiable space that is empirically unproven." In particular, scholars question the accuracy of the construction of rural geographic classifications, and the links between rural classification efforts as "recent impositions of government for facilitating resource allocation."

== See also ==
- National Rural Health Alliance
- Health care in Australia
