= Overseas Student Health Cover =

Australian governmental health insurance

Overseas Student Health Cover (OSHC) is a compulsory health insurance product required by the Australian Government for international students studying in Australia. It is an insurance product that gives international students a level of insurance coverage based on the Australian Medicare system.

Students can arrange to pay for their OSHC through their educational institution. However, students can still choose their own OSHC provider even when their educational institution makes a specific recommendation because they have negotiated a preferred provider arrangement with a particular insurer.

== Deed ==
OSHC is only able to be offered by Australian private health insurers who have signed the Deed for the provision of Overseas Student Health Cover with the Australian government. The Deed outlines the conditions required to be met by the registered insurers in order to offer the OSHC product. A legal document between the Commonwealth of Australia and the relevant insurer, the Deed dictates the minimum benefits payable by the insurer, in addition to conditions for which it is not required to pay any benefits. In addition, clause 6.8 of the Deed stipulates the conditions under which the insurers can terminate policies and make refunds, specifically:

- Where the student decides not to come to Australia;
- Where the student has ceased studies and left Australia prior to the end of their visa;
- Where the student has had their application for an extended stay refused by the Department of Immigration and Citizenship;
- Where the student has been granted permanent residence;
- Where the student has been outside Australia for a period exceeding 3 months; or
- Where the student holds an OSHC from another insurer.

== Exceptions ==
OSHC may not be needed through the Reciprocal Health Care Agreements if the student is from one of the following countries:

- Belgium
- Finland
- Italy
- Malta
- Netherlands
- New Zealand
- Norway
- Republic of Ireland
- Slovenia
- Sweden
- United Kingdom

== Providers ==
As at 20 December 2019, there were six health insurers who are signatories to the OSHC Deed . Those are:

- CBHS International Health
- Medibank Private
- NIB OSHC
- BUPA Australia
