= CSRA =

CSRA may refer to:

- Central Savannah River Area, a trading and marketing region in the U.S. states of Georgia and South Carolina
- Civil Service Reform Act of 1978, a reorganization of the executive branch of the U.S. federal government following the Watergate scandal
- Pendleton Civil Service Reform Act, an 1883 law establishing a merit system for U.S. federal employees
- Consejo de Salud Rural Andino, an American non-profit organization
- CSRA (IT services company), an information technology company that performs contract work for the U.S. federal government
