= Private Health Insurance Ombudsman =

The Private Health Insurance Ombudsman was an Australian Government agency which acted independently of the government in investigating complaints involving private health insurance and reporting. The role and functions of the office are contained in Sections 230–256 of the Private Health Insurance Act 2007.

== Role and functions ==
The office protected the interests of people who are covered by private health insurance by investigating complaints and assisting in the resolution of complaints. It also published independent information about private health insurance and the performance of health funds. According to the Australian Government's website, the ombudsman "provides private health insurance members with an independent service for health insurance problems and enquiries."

The office stated that it expected to fulfill this role by handling complaints in a high quality manner; by providing information and advice to consumers; and by providing information, advice, and recommendations to the Government.

== History ==
Originally, the Private Health Insurance Ombudsman was established on 4 March 1996 as the Private Health Insurance Complaints Commission (PHICC). The name was changed in 1998.

On 1 July 2015, the Private Health Insurance Ombudsman merged with the Commonwealth Ombudsman, as part of the smaller government measures in the 2014 federal budget.

== Ombudsman officeholders ==
Samantha Gavel was appointed Ombudsman on 1 April 2008 for a three-year term. Gavel held the position until she was appointed National Health Practitioner Ombudsman and Privacy Commissioner in January 2015. David McGregor was appointed acting Private Health Insurance Ombudsman until 30 June 2015, when the Private Health Insurance Ombudsman was merged with the Commonwealth Ombudsman.

== See also ==
- Healthcare in Australia
