= Dental care in adolescent Australians =

The dental care in adolescent Australians is overall good. Studies have shown that the majority of the children in some regions of Australia are receiving the dental care that they need. However, other studies have shown that the children and young adults still encounter poor quality dental care, and some do not have access to a dentist due to financial barriers. Children in the lower income groups were the most likely to not receive the dental care they needed because of the cost of the treatment. There are several things that the adolescents can do in order to stay proactive in healthy dental hygiene. Young Australians today have less tooth decay because of fluoride. Natural fluoride found in water has significantly increased the dental health of the adolescents, and decreased the tooth-aches. For those that do not have access to water with fluoride due to the area in which they live in, they can use alternatives such as toothpaste that does contain fluoride.

== Statistics ==
The Australian Institute of Health and Welfare conducts periodical surveys of the dental health of Australian children and teenagers. The Institute's 2010 survey found that the majority of Australian children had good dental health, with 70% of children making a dental visit in the previous 12 months, and 84% of these visiting for a check-up. However, it also found that:

- 7% of children had experienced toothache, and 10% avoided certain foods during the previous 12 months.
- Children from low income households were more likely to experience toothache and fair or poor oral health than were children from high income households, and children from these low income households were less likely to have visited a dentist. They were also 7 times more likely to have avoided or delayed dental visits due to cost.
- Less than one third of pre-school aged children had ever visited a dentist.

Levels of dental health also vary across demographics. In particular, Indigenous Australians tend to score worse on almost every dental health indicator, relative to their non-Indigenous counterparts.

== Factors influencing dental health ==
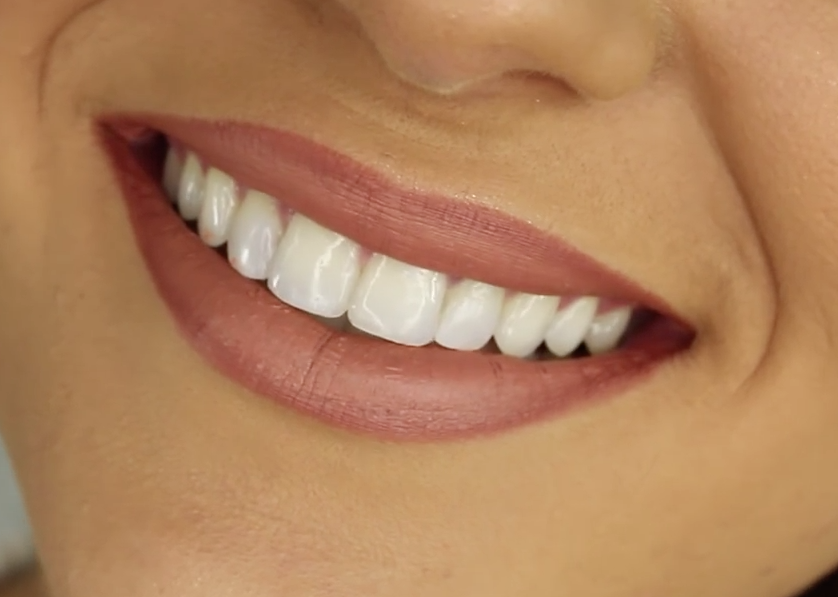
Example of a healthy adolescent smile

Carbohydrate intake, accumulation and retention of plaque, frequency of exposure to dietary acids, exposure to fluoride and other trace elements, and natural protective factors such as saliva are five of the key factors that influence dental decay. Dental health is also affected by the dental, diet, and lifestyle habits of individuals, and by the fluoridation of toothpaste and drinking water.

=== Dental habits ===
Early childhood is an important time to establish good dental health habits (including brushing and dental visits), reducing the risk of disease and leading to better health in adulthood. However, financial constraints can lead to children in lower income households being less likely to access dental care than those in higher income households.

=== Dietary habits ===
High-sugar foods such muesli bars, lollies, and sugary drinks and juices can contribute to dental decay, as can refined carbohydrates found in crackers and chips. The Australian Dental Association recommends that parents limit their children's intake of these foods, in favour of healthier snacks.

International studies have also found eating disorders in adolescents can result in negative dental health consequences. A 2015 paper suggests that the prevalence of eating disorders among Australian adolescents may be as much as 15% in females and 3% in males.

=== Drug and alcohol use ===
Smoking, and consumption of alcohol and other drugs can begin to have a negative impact on oral health as children enter adolescence. Regular consumption of alcohol can lead to tooth decay, and smoking can result in gum damage and future oral cancers.

=== Fluoridation ===
Australians born after 1967 were named the "Fluoride Generation" because they had been exposed to fluoridated water and toothpaste that contained fluoride since birth. Longitudinal studies have found that as young adults, this generation experienced half the level of decay observed in their parents' generation at the same age, and that much of the benefit of fluoridation was accrued in childhood rather than later life. As of 2007, around 80% of Australians had access to fluoridated water, although this statistic varied significantly across jurisdictions.

== See also ==
- Australian Dental Association
