= Prison healthcare in Australia =

Healthcare is a major issue for people in custody in Australia. People in prison have substantially more complex physical and mental health care needs than the general population, and have significantly higher rates of both diagnosed and undiagnosed conditions. Despite their higher health needs, people in prison have significantly less access to healthcare in custody compared to the general Australian population.

There are no national standards for healthcare in Australian prisons. Prisoners in all jurisdictions, however, are prevented from accessing the Medicare universal health care system or the Pharmaceutical Benefits Scheme (PBS), which contributes to the lack of healthcare in custody as many prisons are unable to afford certain services and medications without Medicare or PBS rebates. Other issues inhibiting healthcare provision in custody include limited access to the National Disability Insurance Scheme, no access to needle and syringe programs, being reliant on prison officers to make medical appointments, and issues with record keeping.

== Health services ==
There are no national standards for healthcare in Australian prisons. There are eight prison systems in Australia, one for each internal state and territory. No jurisdiction provides access to the Medicare universal health care system. In the absence of Medicare, each jurisdiction in Australia provides healthcare in custody differently through a variety of models, including services being provided by the public sector, outsourced to private providers, or through public-private partnerships. While prisoners do receive free healthcare, the range of services and medications are significantly lower than those available to the general community. Growth in prison populations around Australia are not matched with an equivalent growth in prison health resources or budgets. Medical issues in prisons were the most common category of complaint made to the Ombudsmen in New South Wales (NSW) during 2022–2023. Similarly, in Victoria in 2021–2022, the Ombudsmen received more complaints about Corrections Victoria than any other government department, with health services being the most frequent issue complained about within prisons.

=== Physical health ===
Prisoners on average are less healthy and have higher rates of chronic illnesses, infectious diseases, acquired brain injuries and drug use than the general community. People entering prison typically come from extremely disadvantaged backgrounds, and may have under-utilised health care prior to entering custody, as health was viewed as a lower priority than issues including housing, employment, caring obligations or drug addiction. For example, 43% of people entering prison were homeless, making prison entrants about 100 times more likely to be homeless than other Australians.

Prisons in Australia often lack the necessary equipment to provide various medical treatments. Medical room at Boggo Road Gaol, c. 1988

Despite their higher health needs, there is a lower level of health care available in prison than in the general community. However, for people in prison who underuse health services prior to their incarceration, prison can provide an opportunity to obtain treatment and improve health; 26% of people released from prison report being diagnosed with a previously unknown health condition while in custody. Among people being released from prison, approximately 53% reported their health improved in custody, 22% said it stayed the same and 25% said it deteriorated. While many surveyed people in prison rate the health care they receive as better than what they received in the community, these raw statistics do not take into consideration the lack of healthcare access many people had before entering prison.

Most chronic health conditions are more prevalent in prison entrants than the general community, though some conditions more associated with older people, such as arthritis and osteoporosis, are much less common in custody. This is attributed to the average age in prison being much lower than the general population. Communicable diseases are more prevalent, partly due to the higher levels of at-risk behaviours associated with people entering the prison system, such as drug use and unsafe sex. While only 18% of Australians have a disability, 39% of prisoners have one. Hearing loss affects approximately 90% of Indigenous Australians in custody.

Nine out of ten people incarcerated in Australia require dental treatment. Furthermore, 6% of the general Australian community between the age of 15 and 64 required dental extraction, whereas 28% of prison inmates between the age of 15 and 64 required an extraction. Some prisons do not offer dental services at all. While prisoners report positive interactions with some health professionals in prison, such as optometrists, reports about dental professionals are often negative, with complaints that dentists focus on extracting teeth, rather than doing fillings, and do not provide preventative services. Prisoners report that access to dental services is a significant concern, and that the typical treatments for toothache in prison, which is being given ibuprofen or paracetamol by nurses, are ineffective.

After their release, people wth poor health outcomes from their imprisonment place significant strain on themselves, the public health system, and the general community. Accordingly, improving the health of people in prison benefits the entire population.

=== Mental health ===
People with mental health conditions, particularly severe ones, are over-represented in Australian prisons. Rates of self-harm in prison occur at 3–8 times the rate of the general Australian community, and around 40% of people in custody report having been diagnosed with a mental health disorder, though it is estimated that 74% of people in prison have mental health disorders due to both undiagnosed conditions, and underreporting due to the consequences of disclosing such conditions. The typical response to reporting depression, self-harm or serious mental health issues in custody is to place the prisoner in solitary confinement under protective grounds. This practice exacerbates mental health conditions and rehabilitation prospects, and has been criticised for years, though remains common due to the absence of more appropriate supports. Mental health services offered in prison are widely considered to be inadequate, and prisoners typically have little to no access to ongoing counselling services in custody. Where psychological services do exist, they often focus on risk management services, rather than providing ongoing therapy.

As of 2023, there are no guidelines in Australia for the number of mental health staff who should be working in prisons. Accordingly, the guidelines in the United Kingdom, which recommend one full-time mental health worker for every 50 prisoners, are often cited in relation to Australian prisons. Only the Australian Capital Territory, the jurisdiction with the fewest prisoners in the country, meets this recommendation. In Western Australia, there are less than three full-time psychologists for the state's 17 prisons, giving a ratio of one psychologist per 2066 people, compared to a rate of one per 1031 people in the general population in that State.

== Issues accessing healthcare ==
Many issues make health care access more difficult in prison than in the community. Prisoners have no choice of when they can access medical services in custody, face a restricted choice of healthcare providers, and experience longer wait times for services. Only 46% of surveyed prisoners in Australia reported they could easily see a doctor when required. Transport to medical appointments is significantly difficult, as consultations may require being transferred to another prison. If the location of that prison would prevent family members from visiting, has a higher security rating, or is perceived as more dangerous, people in custody might choose to forego a medical appointment. Prisoners may also decline medical appointments that need to take place in the general community to avoid the humiliation of being escorted in public while in shackles and prison clothing. Appointments that are booked may be cancelled due to staff shortages. In 2022, a Victorian prisoner killed himself after his appointment for cancer treatment was cancelled three times in a row due to staff shortages. The Coroners Court of Victoria found the appointment cancellations were a motivating factor in his suicide, and were "not consistent with the standard of medical care available in the community".

Paying for personal medical practitioners instead of relying on free services provided by the prison is not affordable for most people in custody. Officially, prisoners can apply for approval to be taken to an external medical practitioner, though they must pay the costs of their transport and escort by prison officers. The average cost of transport and escort to an external medical practitioner from a NSW prison is $1,060 per trip.

Accessing healthcare in custody requires a more advanced level of health literacy than is needed in the community, which may produce greater difficulties in both asking for and receiving healthcare. Prisoners on remand in Australia may not be eligible for certain healthcare treatments, such as drug and alcohol programs and psychological services, and may not be eligible for continuity of care programs if they are released without conviction. The timing surrounding release of prisoners from remand is often uncertain, leading to difficulties in preparing discharge reports. Women in custody do not receive the same level of reproductive care as those in the community, and may not have the option of seeing a female doctor.

=== Prison officers ===
One of the main barriers to healthcare in custody is that prison officers with no medical background act as the gatekeepers for health requests and appointments. Access to health care in prison has been described as "wholly contingent" on an incarcerated person's ability to persuade staff that they need a medical appointment. Officers may not book appointments if they do not believe conditions are serious enough, and have the authority to over-ride recommendations from health professionals. A 2024 report into prison healthcare in Australia stated that this power is unique to prison environments, as prisoners are reliant for their healthcare from a person who is not necessarily obligated to act in their best interest. Needing to disclose confidential reasons for a medical appointment to a prison officer may discourage people from trying to make appointments in the first place. None of the mandatory components in the national qualification for prison officers address health care. Staff at the Alexander Maconochie Centre who work in the crisis unit, which is designed to house incarcerated people who are at a high risk of self-harm or suicide, do not receive additional training.

=== Medicare exclusion ===
Prisoners in Australia have never had access to Medicare, Australia's otherwise universal health care system. This is due to Federal Government cost-cutting legislation introduced in 1976, which removed Medicare access from anyone receiving healthcare under an arrangement with a State or the Commonwealth. Prisoners do not technically lose their Medicare eligibility, and can access Medicare benefits while on day release or parole. However, prison systems have long believed the relevant legislation forbids them for applying for Medicare benefits. While the Medicare exclusion in prisons was never intended to be a punitive measure, as a result of the exclusion, many health services cannot be provided as they are considered too expensive to provide without Medicare rebates. In some cases, there is also no non-Medicare equivalent of a service available. Examples include screening children in custody for fetal alcohol spectrum disorder, and Medicare Item 715, the Indigenous Health Assessment. This test was established as a proactive treatment as Indigenous Australians have been identified as having higher rates of many chronic illnesses. Coronial Inquests into several deaths in custody have noted the lack of Item 715 in prison, and have called for the trial of Medicare services in prisons.

Government reports have been calling for the introduction of Medicare in prisons since at least 1985. Other calls for the introduction of Medicare into prisons have come from the Australian Medical Association, the Royal Australian College of General Practitioners, the Royal Australian and New Zealand College of Psychiatrists, the Royal Commission into the Protection and Detention of Children in the Northern Territory, the Law Council of Australia, and Queensland Health. There is compelling evidence that introducing Medicare into prisons would have a positive return on investment, as prisoners who receive adequate healthcare are less likely to reoffend, and the cost of re-incarceration is significantly more expensive than the cost of providing healthcare.

Prisons restrict access to Medicare as they believe that by doing so they are complying with the Health Insurance Act 1973, the legislation that governs Medicare billing. However, in 2024 it was argued that due to the wording of the legislation and existing precedent from the High Court of Australia, prisoners were legally entitled to Medicare. In 2025, legal and health professionals arranged for mental health treatments to be provided to a prisoner via Telehealth, which were then successfully billed to Medicare. As of 2026, a Federal Court challenge was being made arguing that Medicare access in prisons is legal.

=== Restricted access to medications ===
Prisoners do not have access to over-the-counter medical items and medications regularly taken for granted in the general community, and are required to see nurses to obtain basic items such as adhesive bandages, skin creams and paracetamol. Some medications that are available over-the-counter in the community may only be available in prison via prescriptions. Prisoners are often not allowed to store their medication in their cells due to security concerns, and can only obtain their medication at certain times. A 2019 survey at the Alexander Maconochie Centre found that 51% of prisoners reported that it was difficult to get over-the-counter medication when needed, and 58% reported that medication was either never or rarely provided in a timely manner.

As prisoners do not have access to the Pharmaceutical Benefits Scheme (PBS), prisons instead prescribe from smaller approved lists of medications. Accordingly, people entering custody may have to change their existing prescribed medications to alternatives. Prisoners are not allowed to take any existing medications into prison. All medications will be confiscated upon entering prisons, and the medications or equivalents can instead be applied for when a prisoner has a medical appointment. This can take weeks after entering the prison system. Continuity of mental health medications from the community into prisons is considered to be particularly poor, and the disruption of medications upon arriving in prison is a frequent complaint from prisoners. Prisons purchase medications through contract agreements, which can cause delays as to when certain medications become available. For example, dulaglutide became available on the PBS in 2018, but did not become available in NSW prisons until 2021.

Medical professional whistleblowers working in prisons have reported grossly inadequate access to medications, including delays in chemotherapy for several weeks and "potentially illegal" management of medications. Prisoners themselves report being prescribed the wrong medication or unsuitable medication, and being subjected to punishment for refusing to take medication, even if they report being allergic to it. Medications that produce a sedative effect are over-prescribed in prisons as they moderate behaviour, rather than for any healthcare reasons.

=== NDIS restrictions ===
Prisoners have restricted access to the National Disability Insurance Scheme (NDIS), as the relevant legislation limits the number of services that can be provided to people in prison and explicitly forbids using NDIS for day-to-day support. Typically, only transitional support services can be accessed. It is considered "exceedingly difficult" to apply for NDIS funding in prison. A 2018 investigation by the Victorian Ombudsmen reported on a case of a woman held in solitary confinement for 18 months who was caught in a procedural trap as the agency responsible for NDIS refused to give her a plan until she had a release date, but the prison refused to give her a release date until she had an NDIS plan. The limited NDIS access exacerbates existing deficits with providing treatment to people with disabilities in custody, and the lack of treatment available is considered to be a factor in increasing reoffending. Difficulty accessing appropriate disability services is an issue frequently raised by prisoners.

=== Lack of needle exchange programs ===
Hepatitis C it is most frequently transmitted in prison by sharing needles. No Australian jurisdiction provides prisoners with a needle and syringe program, which has been attributed to causing a Hepatitis C crisis in prisons. It is estimated that between 23 and 47% of men in prison have Hepatitis C, and over 70% of women in prison; 70% of people who inject drugs in Australian prisons report sharing needles.

The first Australian Government report dedicated to prison healthcare, which was released in 1991, recommended the introduction of needle exchange. A 2015 inquiry by the Parliament of Australia into Hepatitis C found there was strong evidence and support for the introduction of needle exchange programs in prisons from health professionals. A 2023 report by the Australian Institute of Health and Welfare on the health on people in prison stated that needle and syringe exchange programs are effective, and that in countries where these programs have been introduced into prisons there has been a decrease in blood-borne virus transmissions, and no major negative consequences. A 2025 study estimated that providing a needle exchange service in Australian prisons would save taxpayers $31.7 million over a five-year period by preventing 1,416 infections. Such a program is estimated to only cost $12.2 million to provide during that time, meaning every dollar invested into needle exchange in prisons is expected to save taxpayers more than two dollars.

=== Inadequate record keeping ===
Many prison records are not kept electronically, and are still paper-based. Both prisoners and prison staff report that when people are transferred to different prisons, their paper medical records can be lost. In cases where electronic records are created, deficits have still been reported which do not allow all information from paper records to be recorded electronically. A Coronial Inquest found that the 2018 death of Mottijah Shillingsworth, an Indigenous man in prison who died from a preventable ear infection, was impacted by the lack of electronic records, which was a factor in his initial misdiagnosis. Coronial Inquests into deaths in custody have found that medical records in prison are incomplete, inaccurate, misleading and under-accessed by medical staff.

There is limited sharing of information of health records in prisons. In NSW, there are five information systems for prison health records, including a mix of electronic and paper records. As of 2021, the database for dental treatment is not linked to the main medical treatment system, meaning it is difficult for regular health staff to assess, for example, if a patient who has an infection resulting from a dental appointment requires treatment. There is no automatic alert within the systems to let medical staff know that a patient has been moved to another prison. Accordingly, staff at a prison a patient has been transferred to may be unaware of existing appointments. The lack of integrated electronic record systems increases the amount of time and resources spent obtaining information regarding heath records.

Many health records in prison are not linked with the My Health Record system used by the general public, nor are prisons able to access records from this system, which are available instantly to health practitioners in the community. Records from the community are instead verified by prison staff manually, a process that can take several days, and for which there are no mandated timeframes from obtaining information. Prisoners are not given copies of some health records upon release, and instead must apply for them through Freedom of information. As people leaving custody do not have easy access to their prison medical records, some medical tests and assessments completed in prison are redone in the community, as this can be less time-consuming than applying for records. This results in increased costs to taxpayers and additional strain on public healthcare systems. Tests are sometimes repeated in prison due to paper records being lost. Due to the lack of integration with the broader health system, initial health assessments completed in prison rely heavily on prisoners both understanding and reporting their health conditions and medications, rather than connections with external clinicians in the community. This requires a high level of health literacy that is not often common among prisoners.

== Rights, international obligations and legal recourses ==
The lack of healthcare access in custody is considered to be in violation of several binding United Nations treaties which Australia has ratified. For example, the lack of Medicare access is considered to violate Article 12 of the International Covenant on Economic, Social and Cultural Rights, Article 7 of the International Covenant on Civil and Political Rights (ICCPR) and Article 15 of the Convention on the Rights of Persons with Disabilities (CRPD). It is further considered to be violating non-binding resolutions including Article 24 of the Declaration on the Rights of Indigenous Peoples, and Rule 24(I) of the Standard Minimum Rules for the Treatment of Prisoners. Australia violates several other Standard Minimum Rules for the Treatment of Prisoners in relation to healthcare, such as not providing equivalent healthcare to that in the community, handcuffing women during childbirth, and a lack of appropriate disability support. Likewise, excluding prisoners from full NDIS access is inconsistent with the CRPD. Individual cases have been considered to have violated the CRPD.

It has been legally held that people in prison retain all civil rights not expressly taken away by imprisonment itself, meaning there is no legal reasoning to exclude prisoners from healthcare. However, the lack of efficient ways to complain about healthcare issues in custody is often raised by prisoners. Complaining about healthcare in prison may lead to further restricted access or repercussions, as opposed to the intended outcome of improving services. Furthermore, visits from prison advocates are typically held in open areas, where disclosure may be heard by staff, and may lead to repercussions. Prisoners have limited legal options to improve their healthcare access. Litigating against prisons or State or Territory governments regarding the lack of Medicare access is unable to be effective, as the restriction is caused by federal legislation. There are no federal prisons in Australia, only those run by state and territory governments, and the Australian Human Rights Commission will only allow complaints against federal organisations. Neither the High Court of Australia nor the Federal Court of Australia has the jurisdiction to hear human rights complaints regarding ICCPR violations in prisons.

People in prison in Victoria do not have the right to legally challenge violations of the Corrections Act 1986, which governs prisons and prisoners' rights in that state. The act technically provides rights for prisoners, but provides no ways to challenge violations of those rights. Accordingly, the act's recognition of a person's right to medical treatment in custody has been described as "arguably illusory". Likewise, both legislation and Government policy documents in NSW detail levels of access to health care in prisons which should be available, however, they provide no consequences for staff for failing to comply with these policies, nor provide any remedies to prisoners if health care is denied. The main option for people in prison to improve access to healthcare is litigation, however, they may be unaware they can take such action, or they may be unable to access or afford legal representation. Even if this action is successful, it may not improve problems in prison healthcare as the only legal remedy available is financial compensation to the individual who initiated the litigation.
