= Healthdirect Australia =

Government-owned and not-for-profit health advice organisation in Australia

Healthdirect
- Type: Government-owned company
- Industry: Health care
- Founded: 2006; 20 years ago
- Headquarters: Haymarket, New South Wales
- Area served: Australia
- Owner: Commonwealth and state and territory governments
- Website: www.healthdirect.gov.au

Healthdirect Australia, otherwise known as just Healthdirect and formerly the National Health Call Centre Network, is the national health advice service in Australia. Funded by the Australian Government and all state and territory governments, Healthdirect provides a number of 24/7 health helplines to all Australians.

The Healthdirect website provides general health advice, a symptom checker which compares symptoms against clinical presentations, and a health directory which lists many primary, secondary and tertiary care services.

== History ==
In February 2006, the Council of Australian Governments (COAG) signed a Heads of Agreement to establish the National Health Call Centre Network (NHCCN). The NHCCN commenced delivering services in July 2007, with its core service operating under a single national name, Healthdirect Australia, and national phone number – 1800 022 222. In December 2012, the NHCCN changed its trading name to Healthdirect Australia, reflecting the organisation’s evolution from procuring and managing telephone triage services to offering multiple services with integrated telephone and online channels. This was followed in November 2015 by the change of the registered name to Healthdirect Australia Limited. After a review of after-hours primary health care in July 2015, Healthdirect Australia began to operate locally tailored after-hours services and new GP advice and support lines. From March 2020 until December 2023 Healthdirect was operating the National Coronavirus Helpline (NCH) providing telephone advice to the public. It handled more than four million calls. From January 2026, healthdirect has been providing 1800MEDICARE (1800 633 422) service. This service offers a free, 24/7 helpline where a consumer can speak to a registered nurse about any health concern. The nurse will provide advice on the next step and can offer an after hours telehealth consultation with a GP.

== Services ==
Healthdirect Australia's services include a helpline available 24 hours a day, an after-hours general practitioner (GP) helpline, the healthdirect website (which provides free health information) and a Symptom Checker (a guided, online self-triage tool allowing visitors to initiate their health enquiry online). The Pregnancy, Birth and Baby service includes a telephone helpline and a website, providing support to families of children aged up to 5 years. Healthdirect services also include the National Health Services Directory (NHSD) and Video Call service.

== Decommissioned Services ==
COVID-19 services and tools in response to the pandemic were launched in 2020 and decommissioned in 2024 having reached end of life and end of use.

In September 2019, Healthdirect and The George Institute for Global Health launched a free online Risk Checker, an online evaluation tool to help Australian consumers check their risk of developing heart disease, diabetes or kidney disease. The Risk Checker was taken offline in late 2024 due to a lack of maintained currency with health guidelines and low user rates.

== See also ==
- Health care in Australia
- Telehealth
- Medicare (Australia)
