= National Rural Health Alliance =

Australian non-government organisation

The National Rural Health Alliance (NRHA) is Australia's peak non-government organisation for rural and remote health.

The Alliance began in 1991 and was incorporated in 1993. It brings together a number of disparate organisations for the common purpose of improving the health of people who live and work in Australia's non-metropolitan areas.

== Member bodies ==
As of June 2024 the Alliance comprises 53 member bodies, each of which is a national organisation. They represent health consumers, health care professionals, service providers, health educators, students and some Indigenous health organisations. The following are current members:

- Allied Health Professions Australia (Rural and Remote Committee) - AHPARR
- Angel Flight Australia - AFA
- Australasian College for Emergency Medicine (Rural, Regional and Remote Committee) - ACEM (RRRC)
- Australasian College of Health Service Management (Regional, Rural and Remote Special Interest Group) - ACHSM (RRRSIG)
- Australasian College of Paramedicine - ACP
- Australasian Sonographers Association - ASA
- Australian and New Zealand College of Anaesthetists and Faculty of Pain Medicine - ANZCA FPM
- Australian Chiropractors Association (Aboriginal and Torres Strait Islander Rural and Remote Practitioner Network) - ACA (ARRPN)
- Australian College of Midwives (Rural and Remote Advisory Committee) - ACM (RRAC)
- Australian College of Nurse Practitioners - ACNP
- Australian College of Nursing (Rural Nursing and Midwifery Faculty) - ACN (RNM)
- Australian College of Rural and Remote Medicine - ACRRM
- Australian Counselling Association - ACA
- Australian Dental Association (Rural Dentists' Network) - ADA (RDN)
- Australian General Practice Accreditation Limited - AGPAL
- Australian Healthcare and Hospitals Association - AHHA
- Australian Indigenous Doctors' Association - AIDA
- Australian Nursing and Midwifery Federation (rural members) - ANMF
- Australian Paediatric Society - APS
- Australian Physiotherapy Association (Rural group) - APA
- Australian Primary Health Care Nurses Association - APNA
- Australian Psychological Society (Rural and Remote Psychology Interest Group) - APS (RRPIG)
- Australian Rural Health Education Network - ARHEN
- Carers Australia
- College of Intensive Care Medicine of Australia and New Zealand (Rural Committee)
- Council of Ambulance Authorities - CAA
- CRANAplus
- Exercise & Sports Science Australia - ESSA
- Federation of Rural Australian Medical Educators - FRAME
- Joint Colleges Training Services - JCTS
- Mable
- Malpa
- National Association of Aboriginal and Torres Strait Islander Health Workers and Practitioners - NAATSIHWP
- National Rural Health Student Network - NRHSN
- Optometry Australia (Rural Optometry Group) - OA (ROG)
- Pharmaceutical Society of Australia (Rural Special Interest Group) - PSA (RSIG)
- Psychotherapy and Counselling Federation of Australia - PACFA
- Regional Medical Specialists Association - RMSA
- Royal Australasian College of Medical Administrators - RACMA
- Royal Australasian College of Surgeons (Rural Surgery Section) - RACS (RSS)
- Royal Australian and New Zealand College of Obstetricians and Gynaecologists - RANZCOG
- Royal Australian and New Zealand College of Ophthalmologists - RANZCO
- Royal Australian and New Zealand College of Psychiatrists - RANZCP
- Royal Australian College of General Practitioners (Rural Faculty) - RACGP Rural
- Royal Far West - RFW
- Royal Flying Doctor Service - RFDS
- Rural Aid Australia
- Rural Doctors Association of Australia - RDAA
- Rural Pharmacists Australia - RPA
- Rural Workforce Agencies Network - RWAN
- Services for Australian Rural and Remote Allied Health - SARRAH
- Society of Hospital Pharmacists of Australia - SHPA
- Speech Pathology Australia (Rural and Remote Member Community) - SPA (RRMC)

== Mission and support ==
The Alliance has core operational support from the Australian (Federal) Government Department of Health. The Alliance's work has remained independent of government and is controlled and managed by its member bodies, through its council. Current members of Council at any given time are listed on the Alliance's website.

The Alliance's interests and constituency are the communities of rural and remote Australia. Rural and remote areas are defined (arbitrarily) by the Alliance as all those places except the nine capital cities and the regional conurbations of Townsville, the Gold Coast, Newcastle, the Central Coast, Wollongong and Geelong. Australia has various formal classification systems of the geographic continuum from 'metropolitan' to 'remote', the latest and most widely used of which is the Australian Standard Geographic Classification System – Remoteness Areas (ASGC-RA).

Despite Australia's general affluence, for a number of reasons the health status of its people deteriorates with increasing remoteness (i.e. distance from its capital cities). The proportion of Aboriginal and Torres Strait Islander people in local communities increases with remoteness and this contributes to the urban-remote health gradient. Across Australia as a whole there is a 12–17 year difference in life expectancy between Indigenous and non-Indigenous people. Between remote and metropolitan areas the difference is estimated to be 3–4 years.

Against this background, the Alliance's vision is good health and wellbeing in rural and remote Australia. The Alliance takes a broad view of health and a long-term view of the development of rural Australia. Its operation is based on the view that all Australians, wherever they live, should have access to comprehensive, high quality health services and the opportunity for equivalent health outcomes. This aspiration requires action relating to the social and economic determinants of health, as well as to factors in the health sector more narrowly defined.

These broader issues include education, housing, employment, rural and regional development, telecommunications, transport, cultural safety, illness prevention, health promotion, and health infrastructure. The Alliance works with consumers, communities and governments to make the diverse communities of rural and remote Australia healthy and health-promoting places in which to live and work.

In 1998–99 the NRHA was a participant with Commonwealth, State and Territory governments in development of a national strategic framework for rural and remote health in Australia: Healthy Horizons. It worked with governments on the updated Healthy Horizons 2003–07 and on its review in 2008.

The NRHA is manager of the biennial National Rural Health Conference. The Conference has become a key event on the calendar of people interested in improving health in rural, regional and remote Australia, whether as community representatives, policy makers, researchers or other stakeholders.

The NRHA was the national manager for the Australian Government of the Rural Australia Medical Undergraduate Scholarship Scheme (RAMUS). The RAMUS scheme was part of the national strategy to increase the medical workforce available to people in rural Australia. RAMUS supported around 2500 rural students since inception in 2000 to study medicine.

The Alliance also managed Stream 2 of the Rural Health Continuing Education program (RHCE2) on behalf of the Department of Health.[2] RHCE2 was designed to foster inter-professional, team-based training and joint continuing development projects in order to better enable practising health professionals to provide health care services, both as members of multi-disciplinary teams and as individual practitioners. The program was also designed to support the retention of rural and remote health professionals.

The Alliance is owner and manager of the Australian Journal of Rural Health (AJRH)

Partyline is the Alliance's flagship magazine.

Friends of the Alliance is a support network for individuals and organisations interested in rural health and in supporting the work of the Alliance.

== Alliance chairs ==
Chairpersons of the Alliance have been:

- Bruce Chater (1993–1994)
- Sabina Knight (1994–1995)
- Sue Wade (1995–1997)
- John Lawrence (1997–1999)
- Steve Clark (1999–2000)
- Nigel Stewart (2000–2003)
- Sue McAlpin (2003–2005)
- John Wakerman (2005–2008)
- Jenny May (2008–2011)
- Lesley Barclay (2011–2013)
- Tim Kelly (2013–2015)
- Geri Malone (2015–2017)
- Tanya Lehmann (2017–2020)
- Nicole O’Reilly (2020–present)
