= Consejo de Salud Rural Andino =

Consejo de Salud Rural Andino (CSRA) is a non-profit, non-governmental organization that specializes in administering health network, offering services in designing, implementing, monitoring, and evaluating health projects through a community-based model. CSRA was established in 1983 by its parent organization, known at that time in the United States as Andean Rural Health Care (now as Curamericas Global, Inc). Curamericas Global was founded in 1983 by Duke University and Johns Hopkins University graduate Henry Perry III, M.D., Ph.D., M.P.H. and Alice Weldon, Ph.D. The organization's work was initially based in Bolivia and has since expanded to Haiti, Liberia and Guatemala. Currently headquartered in La Paz, Bolivia, CRSA also has regional offices in El Alto and Montero, Bolivia.

Curamericas Global and CSRA are known for their development of the Census-Based, Impact-Oriented methodology. The CBIO is a community-based primary health care model that allows providers to better understand, effectively treat, and accurately measure outcomes and impacts for the most common causes of unnecessary suffering, sickness. The goal is to reduce mortality using census information with collaboration from the community. CBIO implementation will first identify the entire programme population through visits at least biannually to all homes and then target selected high-impact services to those at the highest risk of death.

The CBIO approach incorporates community census of households and a health assessment of the project area, a drawing of maps and numbering of households, and the development of a program plan with community members that includes both epidemiologically driven health objectives as well as community perceived health priorities.

Native doctors, nurses, community health workers, and volunteers then conduct regularly scheduled home visits to targeted households whose census information reveals a high risk of illness or death. During these home visits, health knowledge and practices are measured and vital events are recorded so that families’ illnesses, health experiences, deaths, births, and migrations are tracked. This information is entered into a health information system so program interventions can be measured and then analyzed with the participation of local people and leaders of the community.

Recent papers describe the Implementation of the CBIO approach over the last three decades in Bolivia and present evidence of program effectiveness, including long-term trends in child and maternal mortality.

A comprehensive Primary Health Care (PHC) program that incorporates principles of the CBIO approach has achieved near-universal coverage of key child survival interventions and achieved levels of child and maternal mortality comparable to those in the United States. The CSRA/Montero, Bolivia Comprehensive PHC Program is now also addressing non-communicable diseases. Community collaboration, routine systematic home visitation, and targeted visits to high-risk households are vital components of the program. CBIO principles are relevant for strengthening the PHC movement, achieving universal health coverage, ending preventable child and maternal mortality, and eventually reaching health for all.
