= CBHS Health Fund =

Australian private health insurance company

CBHS Health Fund is an Australian private health insurance company founded on 1 January 1951 by the Commonwealth Bank (CBA) to provide insurance to its employees. Membership was expanded in August 1996 to include former employees.

== Description ==
The organisation changed its name to the CBHS Friendly Society that same year, and it became independent of the bank. The name was changed again in 2007 to CBHS Health Fund Limited, and coverage was offered to family members of current and former employees starting in 2007. Contractors and franchise holders of CBA Group became eligible for membership in 2014. CBHS is a member of Private Healthcare Australia, formerly known as the Australian Health Insurance Association.

In 2016, data for CBHS customers was stolen from a marketing and member communications contractor.

In 2017, CBHS introduced a mobile app which can be downloaded from Google and Apple stores.
