= Rolf Gomes =

Australian cardiologist

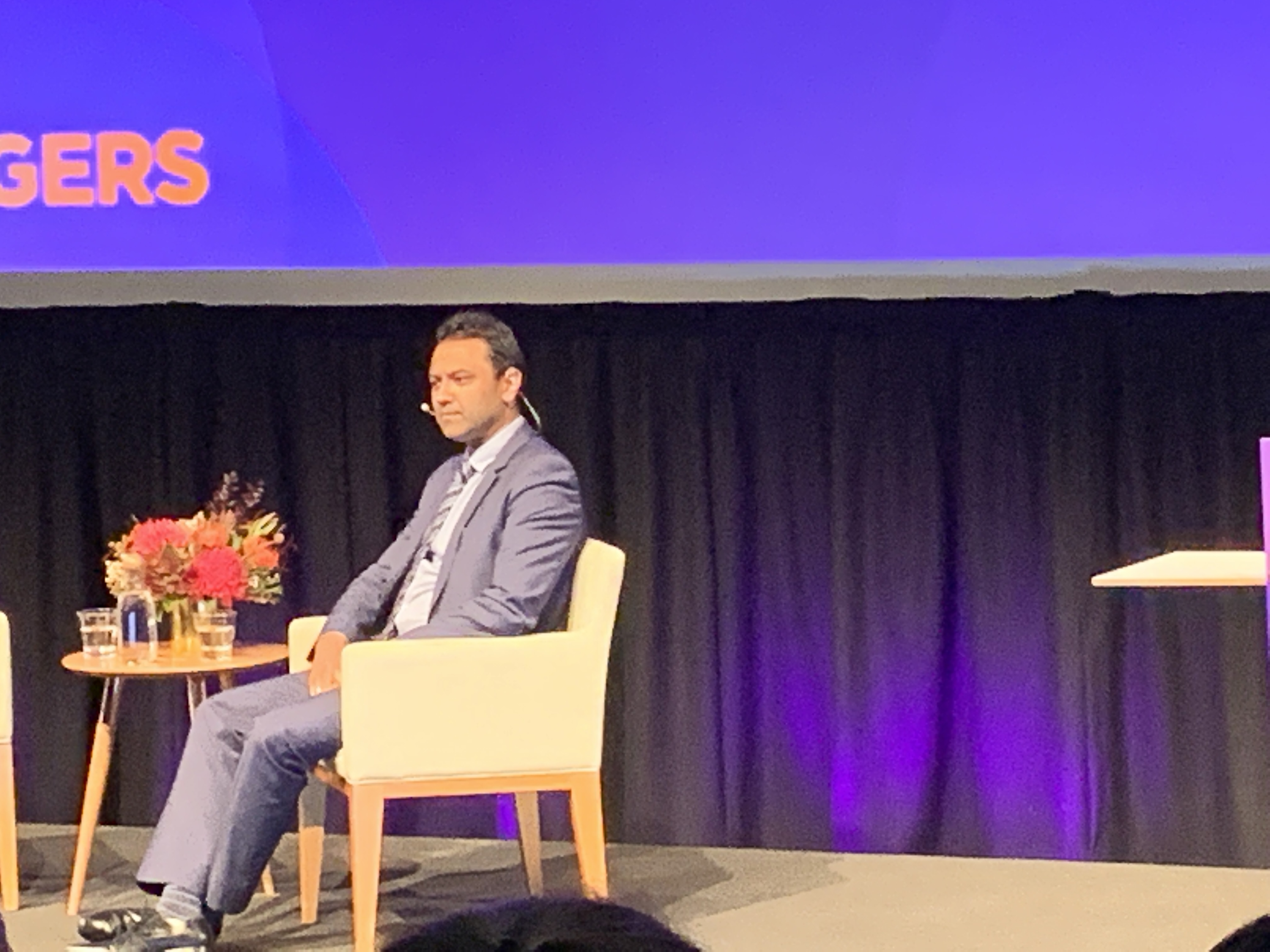
Dr Rolf Gomes, being interviewed at the State Library of Queensland, 16 October 2019

Rolf Gomes is an Australian cardiologist. He founded Heart of Australia, an organisation that delivers specialist medical services (currently cardiac and respiratory health) to people in rural Queensland using large trucks to carry the diagnostic and treatment equipment normally only available in cities.
