= Australian Institute of Health and Welfare =

National public health institute in Canberra, Australia

Agency overview
- Formed: 5 June 1987
- Jurisdiction: Commonwealth of Australia
- Employees: About 600 (at August 2024)
- Agency executives: Zoran Bolevich, CEO; Dr Erin Lalor, Acting Board Chairperson
- Website: aihw.gov.au

The Australian Institute of Health and Welfare (AIHW) is Australia's national agency for information and statistics on Australia's health and welfare. Statistics and data developed by the AIHW are used extensively to inform discussion and policy decisions on health, community services and housing assistance. Under Australia's constitution, health and welfare services are primarily delivered by the states and territories, who are also mainly responsible for the collection of statistics on these services. A fundamental aim of the institute is to promote consistency among national, state and territory statistics, in order to produce comprehensive national data of the highest standard.

The AIHW is an Australian Government statutory agency established under the Australian Institute of Health and Welfare Act 1987. The Act contains very strong confidentiality protections for all data held, and requires the AIHW to publish two key biennial reports in alternate years: Australia's health and Australia's welfare. Numerous other reports are produced each year, all of which are available free of charge on the AIHW website.

In 2016, the Australian Institute of Health and Welfare and the National Hospital Performance Authority merged.
