= Yerbury =

Yerbury is an English language surname. Notable people with this name include:

- Dianne Yerbury AO (born 1941), Australian university administrator
- Edward Yerbury Watson (1864–1897), English entomologist
- Ivor Yerbury, Archdeacon of Antigua 1959–1967
- John William Yerbury (1847–1927), British Indian army officer and naturalist
- Justin Yerbury (1974–2023), Australian researcher into motor neurone disease
