= Medicare (Australia) =

Australian universal health insurance scheme

Scheme overview
- Formed: 1 February 1984; 42 years ago
- Preceding scheme: Medibank
- Jurisdiction: Australian Government
- Headquarters: Canberra, Australian Capital Territory
- Ministers responsible: Mark Butler, Minister for Health and Ageing; Katy Gallagher, Minister for Government Services
- Scheme executives: David Hazlehurst, Chief Executive Officer; Kirsty Faichney, Deputy Chief Executive Officer; Peta Martyn, National Manager (Medicare)
- Parent department: Department of Health, Disability and Ageing (program management); Services Australia (claim processing)
- Website: servicesaustralia.gov.au/medicare

Medicare is the publicly-funded universal health insurance scheme in Australia. The program is managed by the Department of Health, Disability and Ageing, while Services Australia is responsible for claims processing and registration. The scheme either partially or fully covers the cost of most health care and medical treatments, with services being delivered by state and territory governments or private enterprises. All Australian citizens and permanent residents are eligible to enroll in Medicare, as well as international visitors from 11 countries that have reciprocal agreements for medically necessary treatment.

The Medicare Benefits Schedule lists a standard operating fees for eligible services, called the schedule fee, and the percentage-portion of that fee that Medicare will pay for. When a health service charges only how much Medicare will pay, this is called a "bulk billed" service. Providers can charge more than the schedule fee for services, with patients responsible for the "gap payment". Most health care services are covered by Medicare, including medical imaging and pathology, with the notable exception of dentistry. Allied health services are typically covered depending on meeting certain criteria, such as being related to a chronic disease, and some private hospital costs may be partially covered. Public hospital costs are primarily funded through a different arrangement.

The scheme was created in 1975 by the Whitlam government under the name "Medibank". The Fraser government made significant changes to it from 1976, including its abolition in late 1981. The Hawke government reinstated universal health care in 1984 under the name "Medicare". Medibank continued to exist as a government-owned private health insurer until it was privatised by the Abbott government in 2014.

== History ==
=== Health insurance prior to Medibank ===
From early in the European history of Australia, friendly societies provided most health insurance which was widely adopted. The states and territories operated hospitals, asylums and other institutions for sick and disabled people not long after their establishment, replicating the predominant model of treatment in the United Kingdom. These institutions were often large and residential. Many individuals and groups ran private hospitals, both for profit and not-for-profit. These were particularly active in providing maternity care.

A royal commission into friendly societies was held in NSW in 1870–74, which was followed by new legislation in 1875.

An 1876 British Empire royal commission into friendly societies considered the establishment of Victorian colony-run health insurance, and decided against it.

Another NSW friendly society royal commission was held in 1882. It found that the welfare of 175,000 people in the colony was insured by the societies.

If a worker was injured at work, there was no statutory requirement for the employer to pay compensation to the injured person. Compensation was only paid if the worker successfully sued their employer for negligence. They were rarely successful. The UK's Employment Liability Act 1880 aimed to improve the workers' success in court, and was enacted in the Australian colonies between 1882 and 1895. The injured workers remained largely unsuccessful.

The South Australian government passed the Workmens’ Compensation Act 1900, and over the next 20 years, the other states and territories followed. These laws required businesses to pay men who were injured while working for them.

The Invalid and Old-Age Pensions Act 1908 (Cth) provided a pension to people "permanently incapacitated for work" and unable to be supported by their families, providing they also met race and other requirements. This provided money that recipients could spend on their care and assistance.

In 1913, 46% of Australians were covered by friendly societies, with the figure rising to 50% in Victoria, South Australia and Tasmania. These societies employed many pharmacists and early-career doctors.

The federal government's Repatriation Pharmaceutical Benefits Scheme was established in 1919 for Australian servicemen and women who had served in the Boer War and World War I. This allowed them to receive certain pharmaceuticals for free. In 1926, the Royal Commission on Health found that a national health insurance scheme should be established. Legislation to do so was tabled in parliament in 1928, 1938 and 1946, but did not pass each time. It was strongly opposed by the friendly societies and medical practitioners.

NSW introduced a requirement for businesses to have worker injury insurance in 1926, which made it more likely injured workers would receive compensation from their employer. The other states and territories followed.

From 1935 to the 1970s, paid sick leave was gradually introduced into federal employment awards until 10 days sick leave per year (with unused days rolling over into future years) became standard.

In 1941, the Curtin government passed the Pharmaceutical Benefits Act, however it was struck down as unconstitutional by the High Court in 1945.

Another Curtin government action in 1941 was the beginning of the "Vocational Training Scheme for Invalid Pensioners". This provided occupational therapy and allied services to people who were not permanently incapacitated, to help them gain employment. In 1948, this body became the Commonwealth Rehabilitation Service, and its work continued.

Under the Chifley government Hospital Benefits Act 1945, participating states and territories provided public hospital ward treatment free of charge. Non-public ward treatment for people with health insurance was subsidised by the Commonwealth. This led to an increase in the number of Australians covered by private health insurance plans.

Then from 1946, Queensland's Cooper government introduced free public hospital treatment in that state. This was retained by future Queensland governments.

A 1946 referendum changed the constitution so that the federal government could more clearly fund a range of social services including "pharmaceutical, sickness and hospital benefits, medical and dental services."

And so in 1948, the establishment of the Pharmaceutical Benefits Scheme (PBS) expanded the earlier ex-soldier only scheme to all Australians. The Labor government who introduced this had hoped to introduce further national healthcare measures like those of Britain's National Health Service; however, they were voted out of office in 1949, before they had sufficient Senate support to pass the legislation. The incoming Menzies government wound back the PBS, with it continuing in a more limited form than originally planned.

In 1950, the Menzies government established the Pensioner Medical Service, providing free GP services and medicines for pensioners (including widows) and their dependants. (This was enabled by the Social Services Consolidation Act (No 2) 1948).

The National Health Act 1953 reformed the health insurance industry and the way hospitals received federal funding. Health Minister, Dr Earle Page, said that these changes would "provide an effective bulwark against the socialisation of medicine." The federal government began to offer some subsidy for all private health insurance funded services. The very poor received free health care. In 1953, private health insurance covered all but 17% of Australians. By 1969, 30% of all private health insurance costs were being paid by the federal government. While the creators of the 1953 scheme had intended that the subsidised private health insurance would fund 90% of health costs, it only covered between 65 and 70% between 1953 and 1969.

In 1969, the Commonwealth Committee of Inquiry into Health Insurance (the "Nimmo Enquiry") recommended a new national health scheme. The Gorton government under Health Minister, Dr Jim Forbes, provided free private health insurance for the unemployed, seriously ill workers (on sickness benefit), the severely disabled (on special benefit), new migrants, and households on a single minimum wage. In September 1969 the National Health Act was amended, and the scheme came into effect on 1 January 1970.

In 1972, 17% of Australians outside of Queensland had no health insurance, most of whom were on low incomes.

=== Medibank (1975–1976) ===
The Whitlam government, elected in 1972, sought to put an end to the three-tier system by extending healthcare coverage to the entire population. Before the Labor Party came to office, Bill Hayden, the Minister for Social Security, took the main responsibility for developing the preliminary plans to establish a universal health scheme.

According to a speech to Parliament on 29 November 1973 by Mr Hayden, the purpose of Medibank was to establish the "most equitable and efficient means of providing health insurance coverage for all Australians."

The Medibank legislation was one of the bills which led to a double dissolution on 11 April 1974, and was later passed by a joint sitting on 7 August 1974. Parliamentarians planned for Medicare to be funded by a 1.35% income tax (exempting people on a low income). However, this was rejected by the Senate, so it was instead funded from consolidated revenue.

Medibank started on 1 July 1975. In nine months, the Health Insurance Commission (HIC) had increased its staff from 22 to 3500, opened 81 offices, installed 31 minicomputers, 633 terminals and 10 medium-sized computers linked by land-lines to the central computer, and issued registered health insurance cards to 90% of the Australian population.

=== Medibank Mark II (1976–1981) ===
After a change of government at the December 1975 election, the Fraser government established the Medibank Review Committee in January 1976. This led to legislative changes, and the launch of 'Medibank Mark II' on 1 October 1976. It included a 2.5% income levy, with taxpayers having an option of instead taking out private health insurance. Other changes included reducing rebates to doctors and hospitals. Over the following years, universal free hospital access ceased in almost all hospitals, with only the poor receiving free access.

Also that year, the Fraser government passed the Medibank Private bill, which allowed the HIC to enter the private health insurance business. It was to become the dominant player in that market.

In 1978, bulk billing was restricted to pensioners and the socially disadvantaged. Rebates were reduced to 75% of the schedule fee. The health insurance levy was also scrapped that year. The next year, Medibank rebates were cut further. In 1981, access to Medibank was restricted further, and an income tax rebate was introduced for holders of private health insurance to encourage its uptake. Finally, the original Medibank was dissolved entirely in late 1981, leaving behind Medibank Private as a government-operated private health insurer.

=== Medicare (1984–current) ===
On 1 February 1984, the original Medibank model was reinstated by the Hawke government, but renamed Medicare to distinguish it from Medibank Private which continued to exist. Bill Hayden, the Minister for Social Security, opens the first Medicare office in Ipswich, Queensland, on 20 January 1984.

==== Coordinated Care Trials ====
In 1995, the Keating government initiated experiments to find more economically efficient ways of delivering health services. This took the form of Coordinated Care Trials held from 1997 to 1999. They funded a care coordinator for around 16,000 individuals with complex health needs. The trials found that few cohorts benefited from this form of care.

Further trials were held in 2002 to 2005. They found that people with particularly complex needs could be more effectively treated with coordinated care.

==== Medibank Private privatisation ====
In 1997, Medibank Private was separated from the Health Insurance Commission and became its own government-owned enterprise. In 2014, it was then fully privatised by the Abbott Government.

==== Medicare Access Points ====
Extending the Medicare office network, from 2004 many of its services became available through Medicare Access Points in small towns at some community resource centres, state government agencies, pharmacies, post offices and other locations. These were closed in 2011, as HICAPS handled most transitions, and telephone and online services could provide additional service from the home.

==== Easyclaim and successors ====
Easyclaim was launched in 2006, under which a patient would pay the medical practitioner the consultation fee and the receptionist would send a message to Medicare to release the amount of rebate due to the patient's designated bank account. The rebate amount would take into account the patient's concession status and thresholds. In effect, the patient only pays the gap. In recent years, this has largely been replaced with the National Australia Bank service HICAPS (Health Insurance Claim at Point of Sale). For providers not using HICAPS, patients can make claims on-the-spot (where Medicare will pay the patient at a later date), online, through the Medicare mobile apps, or at Service Australia service centres.

==== Diabetes Care Project ====
From 2011 to 2014, the Diabetes Care Project trialed a coordinated care model that was similar to those used in the earlier Coordinated Care Trials. It was found that this model provided health benefits to those involved; however, the cost of care was not significantly different.

==== myGov and Express Plus Medicare app ====
myGov, an online platform for accessing and supplying personal information with the Australian Government was launched in May 2013. It became an important way for people to access their Medicare payment details. The connected Express Plus Medicare app was released in July 2013.

From March 2023, Medicare Card holders gained the option of being able to add a digital Medicare Card to their myGov app, removing the need to carry a physical card.

==== National Disability Insurance Scheme ====
A long-standing criticism of the Medicare schedule was its limited coverage of services to improve the lives of people with disability. This was addressed when the 2013 Labor federal budget established the National Disability Insurance Scheme, which was progressively rolled out across the country between 2013 and 2020. It provides funding for disability supports which are not covered under Medicare, and is administered by the National Disability Insurance Agency and the private and non-government sector.

==== "Mediscare" ====
Towards the end of the campaign for the 2016 Australian federal election in July of that year, a text claiming to be from "Medicare" was sent to certain electorates around the nation, saying "Mr Turnbull's plans to privatise Medicare will take us down the road of no return. Time is running out to Save Medicare." The leader of the Liberal Party, Malcolm Turnbull, had not announced such plans, and the Department of Human Services denied sending the message. It had instead been sent by the Queensland branch of the Australian Labor Party. The furore over the text brought attention to the value of Medicare to Australians. The affair was widely dubbed "Mediscare," which in turn was used to describe fears of the Liberal National Party's alleged devolution of Medicare.

The claims were subsequently given some substance when the Liberal Party voted against a motion including a "guarantee to keep Medicare in public hands as a universal health insurance scheme for all Australians" (and six other Medicare related clauses) in October that year.

==== Health Care Homes and MyMedicare ====
9000 patients were involved in the Health Care Homes trial held from 2017 to 2021, where patients could opt in to register to a 'home' general practice or Aboriginal Community Controlled Health Service which would be funded to deliver chronic disease care under a fee-for-performance basis instead of fee-for-service. The trial ended in 2021 and was not renewed.

Evaluation of the trial found that patients had greater engagement with general practice and improved influenza vaccination rates, but did not result in improved blood pressure or blood sugar control. There was little impact on the financial burden of health care on patients, however some general practices had greater financial outcomes compared to fee-for-service arrangements. The cost of the scheme to the federal government increased compared to baseline; however, the evaluation report theorised that long-term models had potential to reduce overall costs to both the government and individuals. The model of care was generally well received by general practice staff, however GPs and practice administrators felt that the burden of administration of the scheme, as well as funding caps imposed on the trials, impaired its success.

The 2023 Australian federal budget (ALP) established MyMedicare. Similar to the Health Care Homes trial, MyMedicare aims to create a stronger relationship between patients and their main primary health provider, initiated by voluntary registration by patients with a single general practitioner of their choice. Patients taking up the scheme are eligible for additional Medicare benefits for longer telehealth sessions with GPs, and have access to expanded bulk-billed telehealth services if they are in certain targeted groups. MyMedicare participants are also eligible for more Medicare funded services if they frequently attend hospitals or reside in aged care facilities.

==== Medicare Urgent Care Clinics ====
Medicare Urgent Care Clinic logo

The 2023 Australian federal budget delivered by the Albanese Government funded the creation of Medicare Urgent Care Clinics. The clinics are designed to provide care for emergent but non-life-threatening presentations, reducing the burden on local emergency departments. Their operation was contracted to various bodies, initially mainly for-profit primary health companies. Shortly after the program began, state governments set up the similar Priority Primary Care Centres in Victoria and Minor Injury and Illness Clinics in Queensland Satellite Hospitals. The Victorian ones subsequently became Medicare Urgent Care Clinics.

==== my health and 1800MEDICARE ====
March 2023 saw the Australian Digital Health Agency release the my health app for mobile devices. This allowed people to directly access their My Health Record profile from their phone. It allowed patients to access historic prescriptions, pathology results (7 days after reporting), vaccination history, allergy and reaction information, hospital discharge summaries, and advanced care planning documents.

In January 2026, the 1800MEDICARE service launched. This gave 24/7 telephone access to a triage nurse, who could refer people to any kind of Medicare-registered health service. Out of normal business hours, it could also refer people to talk to or engage in a video call with a GP. (This built upon and incorporated the earlier healthdirect phone service established in 2007, and Victoria's Nurse-on-Call service established in June 2006) The my health app also became the 1800MEDICARE app at this time.

==== OpenAI rogue agent hack ====
On 24 September 2026, prime minister Anthony Albanese announced that a rogue OpenAI agent had autonomously directed itself to breach the legacy Medicare Statistics Reporting Service portal to access unpublished government data. The portal is operated by the nation's social services agency Services Australia and provides aggregate data on Australia's universal health insurance scheme including healthcare encounters, medicines and organ donation. It was the first known case globally of an AI agent hacking a government system and has heightened global concern about AI safety and loss-of-control.

The intrusion occurred on 18 June 2026 however was only notified to the Australian government on 10 September via email to a generic public email inbox. Services Australia read the email the following day, and on 15 September, notified the Australian Signals Directorate of the incident. On 17 September, government minister Katy Gallagher was notified, and Albanese was further notified several days later by the agency.

The Albanese government has launched a multi-agency taskforce to examine the breach and evaluate processes for AI-related incident responses. OpenAI is reportedly cooperating with the government investigation.

== Medicare card ==
The 40-year anniversary design used on cards issued throughout 2024 (front) and the previous Medicare card design (back)

Services Australia issues each patient enrolled with the scheme a unique Medicare card and number which is required for a benefit to be made. More than one person can be listed on a given card and an individual can be listed on more than one card. The Medicare card or a digital alternative is used to make a claim at the time of paying for a service in Australia, or used to prove eligibility for medically necessary care in other countries that hold a reciprocal agreement with Australia. Medicare cards can also be used as part of identity verification processes with government agencies and financial institutions.

The card or the Medicare number is required to be provided to enable the cardholder to receive a rebate of medical expenses under Australia's Medicare system, as well as subsidised medications under the Pharmaceutical Benefits Scheme (PBS). The card is usually green in colour, although interim cards are light blue and cards for Reciprocal Health Care Agreement visitors are light yellow. The cards are issued by a government agency called Services Australia.

All permanent residents of Australia are entitled to a Medicare card, except for those who are deemed to be not residing in Australia. Citizenship is not necessary to be eligible for a Medicare card. The card lists an individual as well as any members of their family they choose to add who are also permanent residents and meet the Medicare definition of dependent. The card must be produced or the Medicare number provided if the Medicare rebate is paid directly to the doctor under the bulk billing system. The doctor can retain the Medicare number for use when the patient returns for another consultation. It is also necessary to provide a Medicare number (although not necessarily show the card) to gain access to the public hospital system to be treated at no cost as a public patient. For non-elective treatment (e.g. emergency), public hospitals will admit patients without a number or card and resolve Medicare eligibility issues after treatment.

The use of the card is relevant only to consultations with medical practitioners who have been issued with a Medicare provider number. Such access has been made subject to increasing requirements since the mid-1990s. The Medicare card is used for health care purposes only and cannot be used to track in a database a number of activities. It contains a name and number, and no visible photograph. Individuals are not legally required to have a Medicare card, to carry it with them, or to produce it on request.

Medicare cards are issued by Services Australia (until late 2005 known as the Health Insurance Commission or HIC) to individuals and their families. A maximum of five names can be included on a card. Families with more than five members will have additional names listed on additional cards, while retaining the same card number. Children are listed on their parent's card – a family may be all on one card, or a child may be listed on one parent's card, or both parents' cards, or even in some cases, alone on their own card if their name exceeds a specific number of letters. Children who are wards of the state will be listed on a card with the Department of Children's Services as cardholder. Medicare cards may be used to show a relationship when parents have different surnames to their children.

Individual Medicare cards are generally only issued to people over 15. This is a Medicare Australia policy (not legislation) and there are exceptions for people at boarding schools or away from home. Significantly, this policy may detract from the right of a mature minor to gain confidential medical care. Using their family's Medicare card (and presenting the card) could potentially notify their parents of the consultation, but only if the parents request information about their child's medical claims and for a person to request information about medical claims for people 14 years and over they must have the permission of that person they are requesting the information for.

Several unsuccessful proposals have been made to expand the scope of use of the Medicare card, such as the Australia Card proposal. In 2005, plans to expand the functions of the Medicare card were announced by then Howard government Human Services Minister Joe Hockey. The new card, to be called the Access Card, was intended to replace both the Medicare and up to 17 other similar cards (such as Centrelink benefit and concession cards), and to commence operation in 2008. However, the scheme was criticised by some sectors of the public and relevant interest groups as a step in the same direction of an Australia Card. The Howard government was unable to implement the scheme before the government's electoral defeat in 2007. The incoming Labor government announced on 7 December 2007 that the Access Card scheme would be abandoned. The same aims were later achieved with myGov from 2013.

In 2024, Services Australia produced Medicare cards featuring a commemorative 40-years of Medicare design to celebrate the anniversary of the program. Cards produced from 1 February through 31 December 2024, and cards accessed via the myGov or Medicare Express Plus app, featured a modernised design including the Services Australia logo and a 40-year anniversary wordmark.

== Payments for health services ==
The Department of Health, Disability and Ageing sets a schedule of fees for services that Medicare will contribute to the costs of, called the Medicare Benefits Schedule or MBS. The minister for health and aged care determines the items on the MBS, based on the recommendation of the Medicare Services Advisory Committee. The MBS lists what the government considers a standard cost of that service (the schedule fee) and a percentage of that standard fee that Medicare will cover. The dollar value of the percentage of the schedule fee that Medicare will pay is called the Medicare benefit. For example:

Example Medicare benefit calculations
MBS item	Schedule fee	Benefit percentage	Medicare benefit payment
Item 23 – GP appointments lasting less than 20 minutes	$42.10	100%	$42.10
Item 65070 – Full blood count (pathology tests) Claimed for a hospital inpatient	$16.95	75%	$12.75

The percentage of the schedule fee will be either 100%, 85%, or 75% depending on the circumstances of the "episode of care":

- 100% – for general practice services provided by general practitioners, or a practice nurse on behalf of a GP for Aboriginal or Torres Strait Islander patients.
- 85% – for specialist services, such as specialist appointments, pathology tests, and medical imaging.
- 75% – for services provided to a patient admitted in a recognised hospital, or a hospital-substitution services covered by private health insurance.

=== Bulk billing and gap payments ===
Service providers can choose how much to charge patients for services, including above or below how much Medicare will pay, with patients responsible for the difference. A 2012 study of the OECD found that Australia was the only country out of the 29 surveyed that gave service providers the right to charge more or less than the rebate amount.

When a provider chooses to only charge the patient as much as the Medicare rebate for an eligible service, and directly charges Medicare instead of the patient, this is called a "bulk billed" service. As Medicare covers the entire cost of the service, the individual patient does not have to pay anything. Most providers will only bulk bill concessional patients (people with concession cards, or aged 16 years or under), although some will bulk bill all eligible services for all eligible patients. The government pays an additional subsidy, called the Bulk Billing Incentive Payment, to providers when they bulk bill services for concessional patients.

If a provider chooses to charge above the Medicare rebate amount (whether that be above the schedule fee, or if Medicare does not pay 100% of the schedule fee), the individual patient is charged a "gap payment". For most services, the patient is responsible for paying the gap.

Many industry and professional groups, such as the Australian Medical Association (AMA), maintain their own list of recommended fees that their members can use to base their charges off. For example, the AMA's List of Medical Services and Fees recommends that general practitioners charge $102 for appointments lasting less than 20 minutes. The Medicare schedule fee for the corresponding item code is $41.40, with Medicare paying 100% of the schedule fee for GP services. A doctor that elects to charge the AMA fee will result in the patient being charged the difference of $60.60 as an out-of-pocket cost for the appointment. If a doctor charges less than the AMA recommended fee, the gap payment will decrease, and vice versa.

=== Fee indexation ===
Since the introduction of the MBS, the items listed have been subject to annual indexation aimed at keeping the Medicare benefit in-line with the costs of delivering care. At the inception of the Medicare system, the MBS schedule fees were the same as the AMA List of Fees. Since then, the difference between MBS schedule fees and actual service fees, particularly AMA fees, has grown significantly with increasing costs to patients.

In 2012, the Gillard Government introduced a two-year freeze on indexation as a temporary budget measure. This freeze was however repeatedly extended by the Turnbull and Morrison governments until July 2020. It is estimated that the prevented indexations saved the scheme a total of $3.9 billion. While the rate of bulk billed services remained steady during this period, the gap payment for providers already charging above the MBS amount increased. On 25 March 2018, the Labor Party announced that, if elected, it would remove all remaining indexation freezes, noting how the Morrison government's continued indexation freezes were leaving "families paying higher out-of-pocket costs to visit the doctor."

In the 2017–18 federal budget, the Turnbull government began to re-fund indexation after reaching agreements with the AMA and Royal Australian College of General Practitioners for their continued support of government projects such as the My Health Record system. Indexation resumed by providing $1 billion to index GP items from July 2017, specialist consultation items from July 2018, specialist procedures and allied health from July 2019, and diagnostic imaging from July 2020.

The 2024 indexation rate is 3.5% and is applied to most general practitioner, allied health and medical imaging services from 1 July 2024.

The AMA continues to petitions yearly for increases to MBS payments for services provided by its members, taking the stance that the MBS payments are decreasing in real terms due to annual inflation and that MBS indexation has not kept up. Their annual "Gaps Poster" calculates that despite average Consumer Price Index growth of around 3% each year, the MBS has only increased between 1.2% and 2.5% for most items between 1995 and 2012 (with no increase to medical imaging or pathology services).

=== Private hospital and allied health services ===
All patients that are eligible for Medicare are also eligible for state and territory public hospital services, which are typically free for most patients and funded under an agreement between the federal government and state and territory governments called the National Health Reform Agreement.

Patients in public hospitals that elect to be treated as private patients and patients in private hospitals will have some costs charged by doctors covered at the admitted patient rate (currently 75% of the schedule fee). Hospital costs not listed on the MBS, or where the cost is greater than the Medicare benefit, can be paid by private health insurance or by the patient. For MBS listed services provided to hospital inpatients, where the patient also holds private health insurance for that service, the private health insurer must contribute at least the remaining 25% of the schedule free. If a doctor chooses to charge more than the schedule fee, the private health insurer may contribute towards the gap depending on the insurance policy.

Some allied health rebates are limited to patients with a chronic disease where the GP has initiated a General Practitioner Management Plan, Team Care Arrangements, a Mental Health Case Conference, or is related to a specific disease or diagnosis. Referrals made for conditions covered by one of these may attract Medicare benefits where the service would otherwise not be eligible. These include services such as physiotherapy, podiatry and audiology. Optometry services can be provided without referral, while dentistry is not covered at all. Where the service is not covered by Medicare, private health insurance policies may provide an "extras" or ancillary benefit (typically up to an annual cap) towards these costs.

For patients receiving mental health care, Medicare provides up to 10 fully covered individual and group counselling sessions per year as part of the Better Access Scheme. To access these, a general practitioner, in collaboration with the patient, needs to issue a "mental health care plan" outlining the diagnosed mental health condition, treatment and support options, and goals of care. The Better Access Scheme also covers the cost of other mental health supports, including care from related professions such as occupational therapists, social workers, general practitioners and psychiatrists.

=== Medicare Safety Net ===
The first Medicare Safety Net, setting a maximum amount per year someone could pay for MBS-listed out-of-hospital services, was added in 1991. (It is now known as the Original Medicare Safety Net). The Extended Medicare Safety Net was added in 2004, providing similar assistance for heavy users of scheduled medical services.

To provide additional relief to those who incur higher than usual medical costs, Medicare safety nets have been set up. These provide singles and families with an additional rebate when an annual threshold is reached for out-of-hospital Medicare services. A basic safety net exists for all Australians, with an extended safety net for some families.

The thresholds for both safety nets are indexed on 1 January each year to the Consumer Price Index.

==== General safety net ====
Under the original Medicare safety net, once an annual threshold in gap costs has been reached, the Medicare rebate for out-of-hospital services is increased to 100% of the schedule fee (up from 85%). Gap costs refer to the difference between the standard Medicare rebate (85% of the schedule fee) and the actual fee paid, but limited to 100% of the schedule fee. The threshold applies for all Medicare cardholders and is $594.40 for 2026.

Year	Threshold value
1 January 2006	$345.50
1 January 2007	$358.90
1 January 2008	$365.70
1 January 2009	$383.90
1 January 2010	$388.80
1 January 2011	$399.60
1 January 2012	$413.50
1 January 2013	$421.70
1 January 2014	$430.90
1 January 2015	$440.80
1 January 2016	$447.40
1 January 2017	$453.20
1 January 2018	$461.30
1 January 2019	$470.00
1 January 2020	$477.90
1 January 2021	$481.20
1 January 2022	$495.60
1 January 2023	$531.70
1 January 2024	$560.40
1 January 2025	$576.00
1 January 2026	$594.40

==== Extended safety net ====
The extended Medicare safety net was first introduced in March 2004. Once an annual threshold in out-of-pocket costs for out-of-hospital Medicare services is reached, the Medicare rebate will increase to 80% of any future out-of-pocket costs (now subject to the extended safety net fee cap) for out-of-hospital Medicare services for the remainder of the calendar year. Out-of-pocket costs are the difference between the fee actually paid to the practitioner (subject to the fee cap) and the standard Medicare rebate.

When introduced, the general threshold for singles and families was $700, or $300 for singles and families that hold a concession card and families that received Family Tax Benefit Part A. On 1 January 2006, the thresholds were increased to $1,000 and $500 respectively. From then the extended safety net was indexed by the Consumer Price Index on 1 January each year.

Since 1 January 2010, some medical fees have been subject to a safety net fee cap, so that the out-of-pocket costs used in determining whether the threshold has been reached are limited to that cap. The extended safety net fee cap also applies for any rebate that is paid once the EMSN threshold is reached. The items subject to a cap has expanded since 2010, the latest being in November 2012.

Thresholds for the extended Medicare safety net
Year	Concession and Family Tax Benefit Part A	General threshold
1 January 2006	$500.00	$1,000.00
1 January 2007	$519.50	$1,039.00
1 January 2008	$529.30	$1,058.70
1 January 2009	$555.70	$1,111.60
1 January 2010	$562.90	$1,126.00
1 January 2011	$578.60	$1,157.50
1 January 2012	$598.80	$1,198.00
1 January 2013	$610.70	$1,221.90
1 January 2014	$624.10	$1,248.70
1 January 2015	$638.40	$2,000.00
1 January 2016	$647.90	$2,030.00
1 January 2017	$656.30	$2,056.30
1 January 2018	$668.10	$2,093.30
1 January 2019	$680.70	$2,133.00
1 January 2020	$692.20	$2,169.20
1 January 2021	$697.00	$2,184.30
1 January 2022	$717.90	$2,249.80
1 January 2023	$770.30	$2,414.00
1 January 2024	$811.80	$2,544.30
1 January 2025	$834.50	$2,615.50
1 January 2026	$861.20	$2,699.10

== Funding of the scheme ==
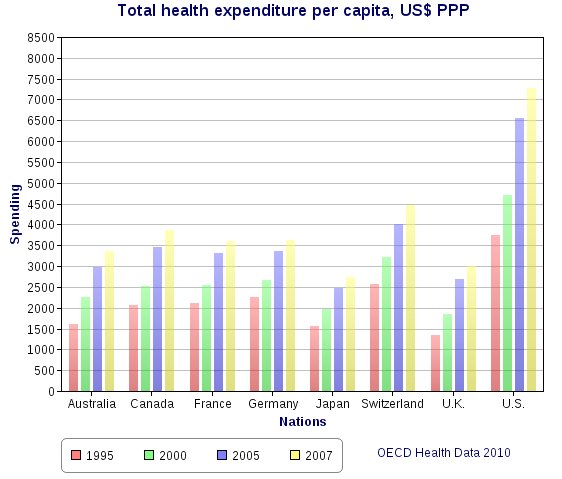
Total health spending per capita, in U.S. dollars PPP-adjusted, of Australia compared amongst various other first world nations since 1995

=== Medicare levy ===
Medicare is presently nominally funded by an income tax surcharge, known as the Medicare levy, which is currently 2% of a resident taxpayer's taxable income. However, revenue raised by the levy falls far short of funding the entirety of Medicare expenditure, and any shortfall is paid out of general government expenditure.

The 2013 budget increased the Medicare levy from 1.5% to 2% from 1 July 2014, ostensibly to fund the National Disability Insurance Scheme. The 2017 budget proposed to increase the Medicare levy from 2% to 2.5%, from 1 July 2018, but this proposal was scrapped on 25 April 2018.

When the levy is payable, it is calculated on an individual's entire taxable income, and not just the amount above the low-income threshold.

==== Private Health Insurance Levy and Lifetime Health Cover (LHC) ====
In 1997, the Howard government implemented a higher level of Medicare levy for high income earners where they did not have a private health insurance policy. The purpose being to relieve strain on Medicare and the public health system by encouraging those that could afford it to receive care in the private system.

From the start of 1999, a 30 per cent rebate on the cost of private health insurance became available to further encourage people to take out private health insurance.

From 2000, the Lifetime Health Cover (LHC) initiative came into effect to encourage people to take out private health insurance with hospital coverage earlier in life. Individuals 31-year or older, and not exempted, are charged an additional 2% on any private hospital insurance policy they purchase for each year after their 30th birthday that they do not have coverage. They are required to pay this additional loading, up to a maximum of 70%, for 10 years, and the federal government rebate does not include the cost of LHC. After 10-years of continuous coverage, the loading is then removed.

=== Low income exemptions ===
Low income earners are exempt from the Medicare levy, with different exemption thresholds applying to singles, families, seniors and pensioners, with a phasing-in range. Since 2015–16, the exemptions have applied to taxable incomes below $21,335, or $33,738 for seniors and pensioners. The phasing-in range is for taxable incomes between $21,335 and $26,668, or $33,738 and $42,172 for seniors and pensioners.

== Eligibility ==
The following groups of people have access to fully-covered health care in public hospitals via the Medicare system:

- Australian citizens
- New Zealand citizens who have lived in Australia for six months or more over the previous year
- Permanent residents
- People who have applied for permanent residence
- Temporary residents covered by a ministerial order
- Citizens or permanent residents of:
  - Norfolk Island
  - Cocos (Keeling) Islands
  - Christmas Island

=== Reciprocal agreements ===
International visitors from 11 countries have subsidised access to medically necessary treatment under reciprocal agreements. Reciprocal Health Care Agreements (RHCA) are in place with the United Kingdom, Sweden, the Netherlands, Belgium, Finland, Norway, Slovenia, Malta, Italy, Republic of Ireland, and New Zealand, which entitles visitors from these countries limited access to public health care in Australia (often only for emergencies and critical care), and entitles eligible Australians to reciprocal rights while in one of these countries.

=== Exclusions ===
Asylum seekers in Australia who have applied for a protection visa and whose bridging visa had expired have no access to services like Medicare, and no Centrelink payments or other social services, and are not allowed to work. It was estimated in July 2022 that there were around 2000 people in this situation.

All prison systems in Australia prevent incarcerated people, including children in juvenile detention, from accessing Medicare while imprisoned. Incarcerated patients are instead entitled to health services, which are funded and/or provided by the state or territory corrections or health department. The level of care available, however, is far below the level given to people with Medicare, and many health services are inaccessible to incarcerated patients as they are considered too expensive without Medicare funding. Prisons restrict access to Medicare as they believe that by doing so they are complying with the Health Insurance Act 1973, the legislation that governs Medicare billing. However, in 2024 it was argued that due to the wording of the legislation and existing precedent from the High Court of Australia, prisoners were legally entitled to Medicare. In 2025, legal and health professionals arranged for mental health treatments to be provided to a prisoner via Telehealth, which were then successfully billed to Medicare. As of 2026, a Federal Court challenge was being made arguing that Medicare access in prisons is legal.

== See also ==
- Health care in Australia
- Medicare (Canada)
- Medicare (United States)
- National Health Service
