= Headspace (organisation) =

Australian youth support organisation

headspace
- headspace National Youth Mental Health Foundation
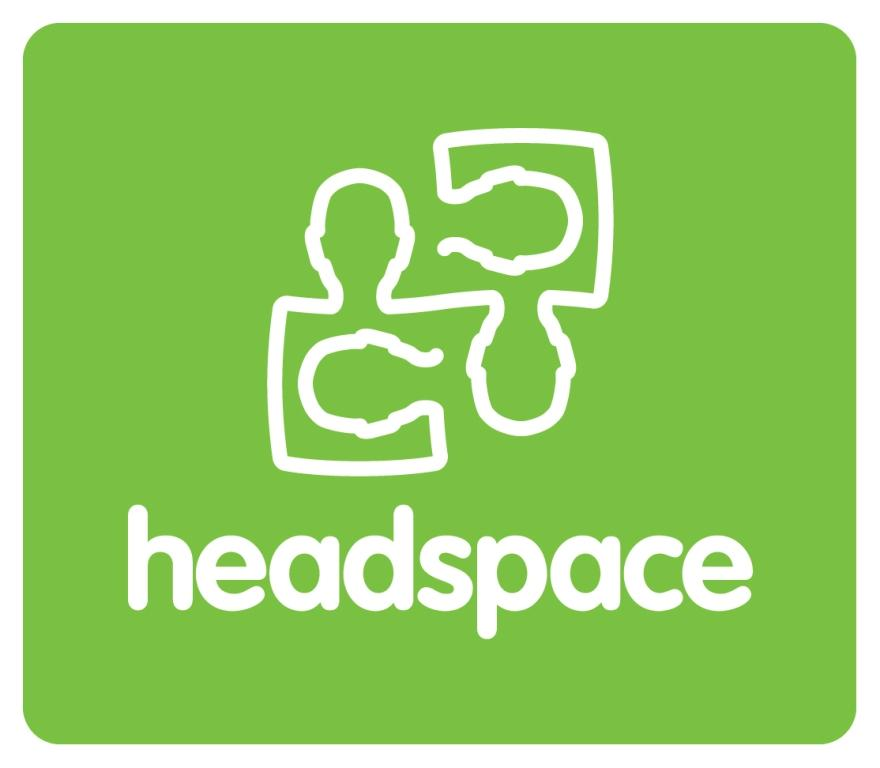
- Formation: 2006; 20 years ago
- Type: Non-governmental organisation
- VAT ID no.: ABN 26 137 533 843
- Legal status: Foundation
- Purpose: Providing mental health support to young Australians
- Headquarters: Level 2, 485 La Trobe Street, Melbourne, Victoria
- Region served: Australia
- Services: Psychology, psychiatry, therapy, nutrition and general health care
- Methods: In-person, online and over the phone
- Board Chair: Ben Shields
- CEO: Jason Trethowan
- Parent organisation: Department of Health, Disability and Ageing
- Revenue: A$74.6 million (2023)
- Expenses: A$81.2 million (2023)
- Website: headspace.org.au

headspace, formally the headspace National Youth Mental Health Foundation, is an Australian non-profit organisation for youth mental health established by the Australian Government in 2006. The project is funded by the Department of Health, Disability and Ageing under the Youth Mental Health Initiative Program, and indirectly supported through the Better Access Scheme.

headspace delivers support to young people aged from 12 to 25 years to reduce the impact of depression, anxiety, stress, alcohol and drug use, and to improve relationship issues associated with sexuality, sexual health, families, and bullying. Young people and their families can get support at a headspace centre as well as online and telephone support service, eheadspace. Many hospitals, especially in metropolitan areas, refer patients that are not a current threat to themselves or others to headspace for longer-term mental health care.

== Centres ==
headspace has more than 175 centres across Australia which can be accessed for free or at low cost. Staff include doctors, psychologists, social workers, occupational therapists, nurses, youth workers, peer workers, counselors and alcohol and drug workers. headspace can help with psychotherapy, counselling, education and employment services, as well as drug and alcohol issues.

== eheadspace ==
eheadspace is a confidential and free space where a young person or their family can call, chat or email with a qualified youth mental health professional. Unlike Lifeline or Kids Helpline, eheadspace is not an emergency or crisis service. eheadspace is available 7 days a week from 3pm – 10pm local time.

== headspace schools ==
headspace Schools and Communities ("headspace schools") is an initiative funded by the Department of Health, Disability and Ageing that provides support to secondary schools affected by the suicide of a student.

== Staff, board and ambassadors ==
headspace is directed by the headspace Board, chaired by John Harvey . The Chief Executive Officer of headspace is Jason Trethowan, who also sits on the Board as a Director.
