= National Disability Insurance Scheme =

Australian disability insurance scheme

National Disability Insurance Agency

Agency overview
- Formed: 1 July 2013; 13 years ago
- Jurisdiction: Australia
- Employees: 3,495 (2019)
- Annual budget: A$35.8 billion (2022–23)
- Ministers responsible: Mark Butler, Minister for Disability and the National Disability Insurance Scheme; Jenny McAllister, Minister for the National Disability Insurance Scheme
- Agency executive: Lisa Studdert, Chief Executive Officer (Acting)
- Parent department: Department of Health, Disability and Ageing
- Website: ndis.gov.au

The National Disability Insurance Scheme (NDIS) is a scheme of the Australian Government that funds reasonable and necessary supports associated with significant and permanent disability for people under 65 years old. The scheme was introduced in 2013 following the "Make It Real" community campaign and advocacy from disability groups, and is governed by the National Disability Insurance Scheme Act 2013 ("NDIS Act"). The scheme is administered by the National Disability Insurance Agency (NDIA) as part of the Department of Health, Disability and Ageing and overseen by the NDIS Quality and Safeguards Commission.

The NDIS model allocates funding to an individual, with the individual, their guardian or a private "plan manager" purchasing goods and services from suppliers. The scheme is entirely publicly funded and not means-tested, with recipients not purchasing or contributing to the scheme directly. The NDIS is independent of the Disability Support Pension and any state and territory disability programs, although NDIS navigation services may help individuals access these supports. The NDIS exclusively funds disability supports, not healthcare-associated costs. These remain publicly funded under Medicare and state and territory government health services.

In 2024, legislation was passed to reform the NDIS to better manage the cost of the program and the efficacy of supports provided. The package provides around A$500 million to improve regulatory and evidence-based purchasing mechanisms, revise local linkage services, and reform NDIS pricing to improve transparency and predictability. The legislation was introduced in response to the Independent NDIS Review, concerns that some NDIS participants and suppliers were engaging in fraud, and an increase in low-value supports being funded by the scheme.

== History ==
=== Context ===
In the 1800s, the states and territories operated asylums and other institutions for disabled people not long after their establishment, replicating the predominant model of treatment in the United Kingdom. These institutions were often large and residential.

The Commonwealth Invalid and Old-Age Pensions Act 1908 provided an "Invalid Pension" to people "permanently incapacitated for work" and unable to be supported by their families, so long as they fulfilled racial and other requirements. This provided money that recipients could spend on their care and assistance.

In 1941, the "Vocational Training Scheme for Invalid Pensioners" was begun by the Curtin government. This provided occupational therapy and allied services to people who were not permanently incapacitated, to help them gain employment. In 1948, this body became the Commonwealth Rehabilitation Service, and its work continued.

In the 1970s, care of people with severe disability in Australia shifted from institutionalisation, to being cared for in the community. In 1974, Gough Whitlam proposed a national disability insurance scheme like the scheme created in New Zealand that year. Academic Donna McDonald suggests it was Treasurer Bill Hayden who convinced Whitlam to focus on the introduction of Medibank, the predecessor to Medicare, instead.

In 1991, the Disability Support Pension (DSP) replaced the Invalid Pension, with the aim of increasing recipients' rehabilitation and hours of paid work.

In 2005, the NSW government created the Lifetime Care and Support Scheme, to cover ongoing care for people who had been severely injured in motor accidents.

In 2006, Bruce Bonyhady, chair of Yooralla, met with former Labor cabinet minister Brian Howe, who put him in touch with a group of people who became known as the Disability Investment Group. In 2008, the Disability Investment Group made an independent submission to the Australia 2020 Summit. They then sent their recommendations to the Productivity Commission.

In 2011, the Productivity Commission released a report on the issue. Disability in Australia "was framed as an economic issue, rather than a social issue". Research by PricewaterhouseCoopers in 2011 found that by approximately 2025, the cost of maintaining the status quo in relation to the care of people with a disability, would be greater than the cost of an NDIS. In 2011, the Council of Australian Governments agreed the disability sector in Australia needed reform.

In 2011, it was recommended that psychosocial disability be included in the scheme. Due to the mental health sector's use of the recovery approach rather than a focus on permanent disability, this has been a culture clash.

According to a report from the Australian Institute of Health and Welfare in September 2012, demand for disability aid in Australia had seen significant increases in recent years.

=== Establishment of a NDIS trial ===
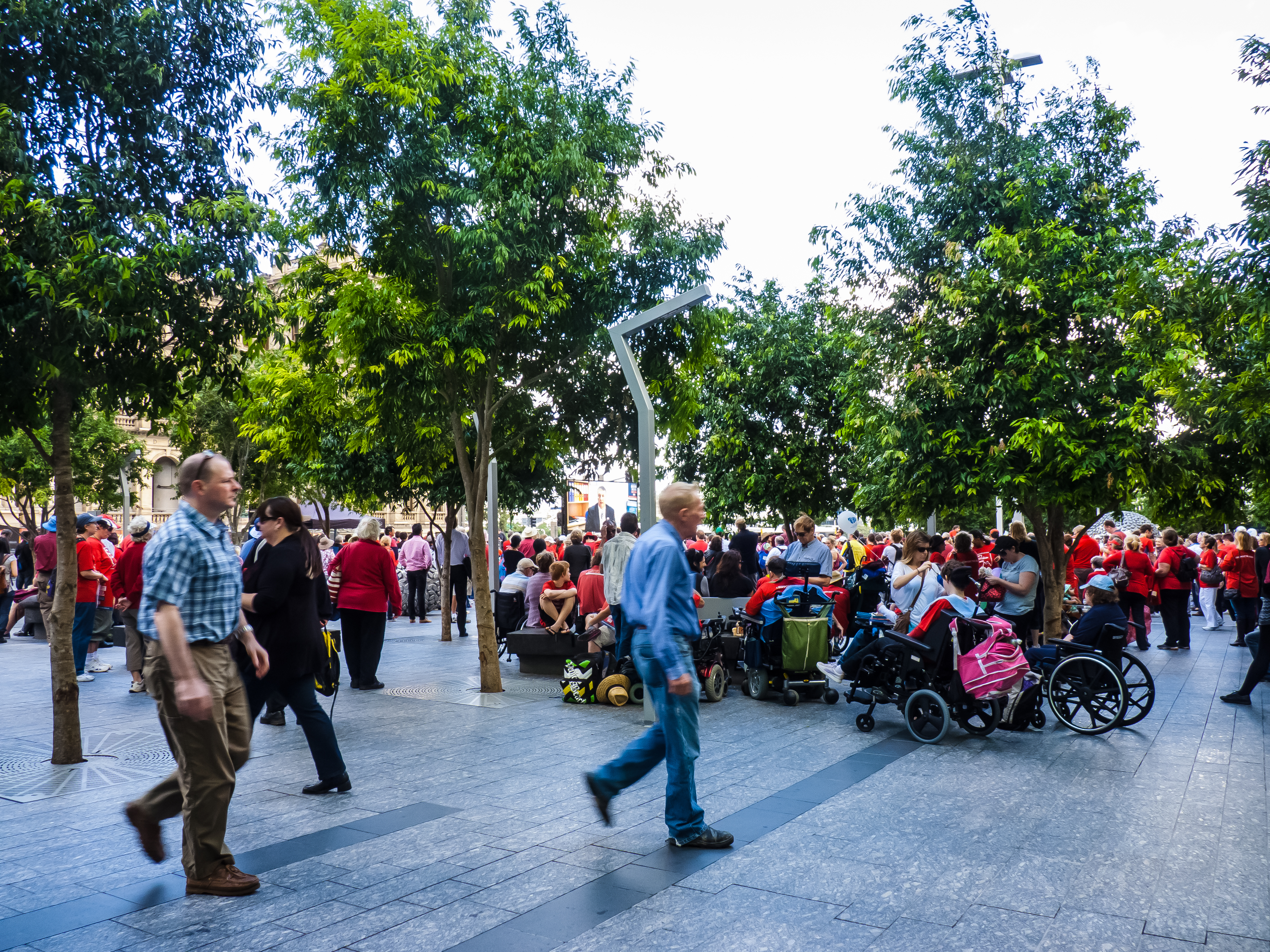
A rally in support of the NDIS, Brisbane, 2012.

In November 2012, a bill to establish the NDIS was introduced into Federal Parliament by Prime Minister Julia Gillard. In March 2013, it was passed as the National Disability Insurance Scheme Act 2013. There is a COAG Disability Reform Council which continues to oversee the NDIS.

When the Abbott government came into power in 2013, the assistant minister in charge of the NDIS was Mitch Fifield, who capped the number of employees the NDIA could have to 3,000, when the Productivity Commission had estimated 10,000.

The 2013 Australian federal budget committed $14.3 billion to the NDIS, to be paid for by increasing the Medicare levy by 0.5%. In May 2013, the Australian Government estimated that the disability sector in Australia would need to double to meet the needs of the NDIS.

The first part of the scheme rolled out on 1 July 2013. It was initially known as "DisabilityCare Australia" and commenced only in South Australia, Tasmania, the Hunter Region in New South Wales and the Barwon region of Victoria. The NDIS began in the Australian Capital Territory (ACT) in July 2014. The Medicare levy increased from 1.5% to 2% on 1 July 2014, to fund the NDIS.

In the first nine months of the scheme, 5,400 people with disabilities accessed an NDIS plan.

Between 2014 and May 2015, a project entitled the National Disability Insurance Scheme (NDIS) Citizens’ Jury Scorecard was led by People With Disability Australia, in collaboration with Max Hardy Consulting, with the support of the National Disability Insurance Agency (NDIA). This involved twelve Australians, including people with disability, being randomly selected to serve as nonspecialist jurors, with the role of determining to what extent the NDIS was achieving its stated vision and aspirations.

In February 2015, the government disability rehabilitation and employment body CRS Australia was abolished, with its functions being distributed via the NDIS and Disability Employment Services markets.

In late 2015, the Abbott government began a process of making significant changes to the board of the NDIA. Current board directors, including then board chair Bruce Bonyhady, claimed their positions were advertised publicly before they were informed. In October 2016, Minister for Social Services Christian Porter, announced his intention to appoint several new board members, including a new chair. The primary experience of the newly appointed members were in corporate sectors, including "financial services, health, energy, resources, education and arts sectors", rather than the previous board member's disability sector experience. The new board appointees, including incumbent chairwoman Dr Helen Nugent, were announced in January 2017.

The 2016 Australian federal budget attempted to make savings of $2.1 billion for the NDIS fund by re-assessing Disability Support Pension recipients' capacity to work, and cutting compensation for the carbon pricing scheme. This included scrapping an ad campaign letting people know about the NDIS. This budget committed to reduce the number of permanent employees in the NDIA to 3,000. Peak disability group People with Disability Australia expressed concerns the NDIS would become a 'political football'.

=== Transition to national operations ===
The NDIS began formally rolling out on 1 July 2016. NDIS CEO, David Bowen, announced his resignation in March 2017, which took effect in November 2017. He was replaced with former Bankwest CEO, Rob De Luca.

In February 2017, the NDIS was developing a virtual assistant called "Nadia" which takes the form of an avatar using the voice of actress Cate Blanchett.

In April 2018, the NDIA announced that Serco would be operating contact centres in Melbourne and regional Victoria for two years. This prompted concern from peak advocacy body People with Disability Australia and others about Serco's lack of experience with disabilities despite being at the first point of contact with clients.

In May 2018, the Australian Financial Review noted that the NDIS was "becoming an economic factor in its own right", particularly in regional areas.

A May 2018 report by Flinders University into the running of the NDIS found that half of all participants in the NDIS have either had their support reduced, or have not experienced a change in their support levels since the NDIS has been introduced.

In 2018, it was reported that the NDIA had a budget of $10 million for legal services, that are employed to attempt to prevent people appealing for more money under the scheme, or to prevent them from accessing the scheme. As of May, 260 cases had been resolved by the courts, with the NDIA losing 40% of them.

The Tune review, led by David Tune in 2019, made 29 recommendations to help the NDIS. The report was handed to the government in December 2019, and was published in January 2020.

In 2021, independent assessments were to be introduced for NDIS participants over the age of 7. The independent assessments will focus on "individual circumstances and functional capacity". Assessors will be qualified health professionals who are not NDIA employees, and they cannot be a participant's regular healthcare professional. Assessments will take 1 to 4 hours, and the assessors will "ask you questions about your life and what matters to you, and ask to see how you approach some everyday tasks. They will work through some standardised assessment tools with you, based on your age or disability".

Disability advocates are concerned about the introduction of independent assessments, and the NDIA has explicitly linked the introduction of independent assessments to containing the cost of the NDIS. While the Coalition government is committed to introducing independent assessments, they do not enjoy parliamentary support. Following a lobbying campaign by disability coalition Every Australian Counts a trial scheme for independent assessments was put on hold in April 2021. Further campaigning saw them fully abandoned in July 2021.

In August 2024, a series of NDIS reforms were passed, slated to reduce NDIS spending by $14 billion over the following four years. The reforms included moving foundational disability supports to the states and out of the NDIS, tightening eligibility rules for some supports, and setting an annual spending growth target of 8%.

In April 2026, Minister for Disability and the National Disability Insurance Scheme Mark Butler announced sweeping reforms to the NDIS aimed at reining in ballooning costs. The scheme's growth will be limited to 2% each year between now and 2030 before returning to a 5% growth rate. The reforms include overhauling eligibility, cracking down on unregistered providers, and reducing funding for social and community participation. The government estimates that, by the end of the decade, these changes will result in 160,000 fewer participants than at present. Some participants will be diverted to Thriving Kids which is intended for children under the age of eight with developmental delays or autism.

== Demographics ==
In June 2019, 298,816 people with disabilities were being supported by the NDIS. This number had increased to 518,000 people by April 2022, representing around 15% of people with disabilities in Australia (base on an estimate of 4.4 million Australians living with disability). Experts interviewed by the ABC suggested that this was in part because people aged over 65 are not eligible for NDIS supports, and that some lesser-visible disabilities were harder to establish eligibility for.

The number of NDIS participants had increased to 761,442 at 31 December 2025, with people with autism as their "primary disability" making up 43 percent of participants.

== Operation ==
From an individual perspective, each participant has funds allocated to their plan. Each plan contains funding that can be spent on pre-approved activities, such as therapies. There are three ways a NDIS plan can be managed: by the participant or their nominee managing the plan, by a registered plan management provider, or by the NDIA. Where the participant self-manages their plan, they are told to keep records of all purchases in case of a future audit.

=== Services ===
The first stage of the NDIS aimed to provide reasonable and necessary support for people with significant and permanent disability.

Supports funded by the NDIS are split across three areas. "Core Supports" include everyday consumable items such as continence aids, personal care assistance, support with social and community participation and funding for transport. "Capacity Building" is intended to build the person with disability's independence and ability to manage their own life. The "Capital Supports" budget is intended for very expensive assistive technology and home or vehicle modifications.

The Information Linkages and Capacity Building (ILC) program aimed the support Australians living with a disability by providing grants to organisations to facilitate economic and community involvement. This included projects that focused on individual capacity, and projects that worked to improve the accessibility of mainstream society. Through the ILC program, NDIS participants had also been supported to run micro-enterprise businesses. From mid-2020, the ILC program transitioned out from the NDIS, and to the Department of Social Services.

During the trial phase of the NDIS, the scheme supported:

- about 3,000 people through the Newcastle, New South Wales trial office
- about 1,500 children up to 5 years of age through the South Australian trial office
- about 800 eligible young people aged 15 to 24 in Tasmania
- about 4,000 people in the Barwon South West region, Victoria
- 2,500 persons in the ACT, as it prepared to become the first territory to have the scheme fully implemented from July 2014.

The number of people assisted rose to 20,000 people with disabilities by 2015. It has been recommended to increase participation to 410,000 however this figure remains uncertain. There are two main entry points to the NDIS, through Early Childhood Early Intervention for those under 6 years old, and the general scheme for those between 6 and 65 years of age.

In 2017, the NDIS had an annual budget of $700 million for specialist disability accommodation, to be used to house 28,000 people with high support needs.

In 2015, over 7,000 young disabled people lived in aged care homes. One goal of the NDIS is to get younger people with disabilities out of residential aged care settings. The Supported Independent Living (SIL) initiative allows for people with disabilities to live in sublet rental properties that are leased through their NDIS provider and arranged to cater for their needs.

Therapies to treat dysphagia were funded under the NDIS until late 2017. Dysphagia, amongst other speech pathology conditions, were revised as health concerns rather than disabilities, and transitioned to being managed by state and territory health services.

In 2024, the NDIS completed between 300,000 and 500,000 payments a day. Until early 2024, claims made out of usual business hours were processed automatically without oversight. It is the second largest claim system in the Australian Government, with only the Medicare scheme processing more claims per day.

=== Scheme costs ===
The cost of the NDIS was a point of contention at a time when the Federal Government insisted upon a return to surplus in the 2013 Australian federal budget. In 2010, the Productivity Commission estimated it would cost A$15 billion a year. In 2012, a Government report revised that figure to $22 billion in 2018. According to the Minister for Disability Reform, Jenny Macklin, the program will effectively double the cost of supporting those with disabilities. In 2012, a number of state disability ministers initially described the draft legislation for the NDIS as lacking flexibility and criticised it for being too prescriptive.

In December 2012, New South Wales was first state to fully commit to funding for the scheme, with costs roughly divided between federal and state governments. The then Premier of Queensland, Campbell Newman, wanted the federal government to fully fund the scheme, arguing the state cannot commit funds while Queenland's debt was high. In May 2013, Campbell Newman signed the agreement in support of the program.

On 2 May 2013, an agreement was signed between Tasmania and the federal government. The state committed to $134 million of initial funding. The Northern Territory signed an agreement to join the scheme on 11 May 2013. From 1 July 2014, the Medicare levy rose from 1.5% to 2% to help fund the NDIS.

NDIS is pooled from multiple sources at federal and state/territory government levels. In August 2016, Guide Dogs Victoria complained that only half of its members are eligible for the NDIS, and that they are losing donations because the public thinks Guide Dogs Victoria is funded under the NDIS.

In January 2017, Scott Morrison announced that the Productivity Commission would be conducting an independent review of the NDIS. In March 2017, a Victorian man who lives at Moriac won a court case against the NDIS, for only agreeing to fund 75% of his transport costs to Geelong for his work and "NDIS-supported activities".

The emphasis of the NDIS has been noted to stem from the 2011 productivity commission report that began it.

An 0.5% increase to the Medicare levy was proposed after the 2017 budget. In April 2018, this was scrapped, as the government had found "other sources of revenue". Disability groups have urged the government to provide greater clarity. In 2018, the Morrison government set up a Drought Future Fund for farmers using $3.9 billion "repurposed" from the NDIS.

The NDIS provides funding to modify homes as per the needs of any disable person so they safely access it and move around comfortably in areas they frequently use. The NDIA also finance fair and appropriate supports related to or incidental to home modifications in some cases.

A 2021 report by independent think tank Per Capita estimated that for every dollar spent on the NDIS, there was a return of investment of $2.25. The NDIS is the second most expensive government program in Australia, after the aged pension.

The NDIS cost 29.3 billion in 2021–22, 33.9 billion in 2022–23, and 38.0 billion in 2023–24. It is forecast to cost 41.4 billion in 2024–25 and 44.6 billion in 2025–26.

In 2024, the Australian government actuary suggested that the NDIS may cost as much as 125 billion per year by 2034 and the growth rate was 23% to 2023.

=== Staffing and workforce ===
In 2017, the Productivity Commission reported that some areas had less than 40% of the number of disability services employees needed to cope with demand for NDIS services. The NDIA spent over $180 million on consultants and contractors between July 2016 and October 2017, which Jenny Macklin argues is due to the NDIA operating under a staffing cap. Disability support workers only identified negative aspects to the NDIS on the quality of jobs in interviews with UNSW. In 2022, the Albanese government planned to remove the staffing cap.

While a 2014 government report on the NDIS predicted the scheme would enable carers to participate more in the workforce or in work-allied activities, as of 2018, there was limited evidence that this was the case.

In 2021, it was estimated that the NDIS employed over 270,000 people, over 20 different occupations, and indirectly contributed to the employment of tens of thousands more.

== Access and fraud issues ==
=== 2010s ===
In 2015–2016, only 76% of participants' funds were utilised. The Productivity Commission expressed concern, as it could lead to poorer outcomes for participants. As of 2017, approximately 90% of NDIS costs were related to participant funding packages.

In 2018, Bruce Bonyhady said that a key issue that was yet to be resolved was what the supports were for those not receiving support from the NDIS. There have been concerns that people with mild intellectual disabilities, as well as those who are socially marginalised, will find it difficult to engage with the NDIS.

In February 2017, Jan Pike, a former Paralympian, said that while having been on the NDIS, it took five months for a wheelchair to be delivered to her, and she could not get contractors to install a shower handrail because they were worried about not getting paid due to the NDIS web portal being "broken". A Facebook group, "NDIS Grassroots Discussion", was created for use by people with a disability to discuss their experiences with the NDIS.

In April 2017, Kirsten Harley, who had a terminal illness, was denied augmented communication through the NDIS because her condition would deteriorate. Neurological Alliance Australia said NDIS plans aren't being made with the input of people who understand neurological conditions and so were inadequate. Dr Justin Yerbury was denied wheelchair and accessible housing modifications due to being assessed as having a poor life expectancy. Tim Rubenach was in the NDIS, but his assistive equipment delivery was delayed until after his death. His family have said that the delays in receiving his equipment hastened his death.

In June 2017, the process of writing NDIS plans was reduced to hours rather than weeks, and people requesting a review were being cut off from basic services.

In May 2017, it was reported that administration times for adults with disabilities in the Barwon region had lengthened, but services had not increased.

Guidelines were developed to show how the NDIS will interact with other systems, such as health systems, child protection, and education services. In September 2017, these interactions were described as being open to "cost-shifting" between the NDIS and existing services.

In September 2017, it was reported that many specialist services were closing due to no longer having block funding, making it harder for NDIS participants to be able to use their packages.

In September 2017, it was predicted that childhood disabilities with a late onset (ages 2–3) were likely to be under-served in the ECEI model.

In February 2018, the peak body for disability services in Australia, National Disability Services, estimated that the NDIS may have owed up to $300 million to service providers.

In March 2018, The Australian newspaper noted that tarot card readers and other fringe therapy providers had become NDIS providers.

=== 2020s ===
In April 2022, ABC News reported that participants or their carers can appeal decisions made around their NDIS funding by going to the Administrative Appeals Tribunal. The amount of funding that young children can be allocated for therapies is determined based on an standardised internal NDIA clinical guidelines, rather than being determined by treating clinicians.

In 2022, Michael Phelan, then the Australian Criminal Intelligence Commission chief, warned as much as a fifth of disability funding in the NDIS was being defrauded by organised crime groups, amounting to $8 billion a year. Criminals have been manipulating participants to fund drugs, holidays and cars, prompting a thorough review.

In December 2023, under Bill Shorten, a new taskforce was launched to crack down on price discrimination by NDIS providers. This will target providers that charge participants different prices depending on if they receive NDIS funding.

In June 2024, a former Treasury economist said "When it comes to the NDIS, we need to talk about the quality of jobs and the quality of supports delivered, not simply the number of jobs and supports. Many of the jobs being created by the NDIS are not frontline care jobs directly benefiting people living with disability". In 2024, the Australian Financial Review stated "The uncontrolled growth in the NDIS is contributing to Australia's inflation and productivity problem, economists and business operators believe [...] Australia is now among the biggest government spenders on disability in the world, outlying more than $84 billion a year (more than 3 per cent of GDP), for items such as the NDIS, disability support pensions, and carer payments."

In June 2024, the Australian Financial Review (AFR) found that some suppliers were claiming up to $20,000 in NDIS funding for participants' travel and holidays. The report notes that while NDIS funding may be used to contribute towards additional costs of holidays required as a result of a disability, the guidelines were "hazy and open to abuse" from unregistered travel operators. Peter Negri, managing director of a disability travel operator, noted that unregistered operators are known to use short-term respite funding to pay for trips to Disneyland Japan or helicopter tours of the Barossa Valley – effectively creating a taxpayer-funded holiday, sometimes at a cost of up to $20,000 per person. Mr Negri states that these fraudulent activities were "ruining the reputations of legitimate providers" and the industry now sees NDIS participants as "buckets of money, ripe for the picking".

In the same article, NDIS integrity chief John Dardo stated that while NDIS payments are set up by well-meaning people, the system was immature. Dardo contrasted the NDIS to Medicare, noting that the latter is much heavily codified with strict rules on what is funded and what is not. He also drew attention to the effect of plan manager, often private company employees who have the authority to approve fund distributions. Some plan managers, particularly smaller organisations, have often been found to frequently authorise funding without any evidence or to related businesses or people. AFR analysis found that around 300 plan managers would not have met the requirement to be issued a Statement of Tax Record, suggesting that these organisations were being allowed to manage participant NDIS plans while not appropriately managing their own general corporate tax and financial matters.

In 2024, an investigation by The Saturday Paper revealed focus groups were conducted by RedBridge polling, to test which narratives were supportive of funding cuts. RedBridge found participants told "believable" fraud and rorting stories were most supportive of cuts. Without that "rhetoric", disabled people tended to oppose scheme reform. The scheme was seen to be "as popular as Medicare".

This polling and the associated communication strategy were developed during Bruce Bonyhady's review of the NDIS, and Bonyhady was briefed on focus group outcomes. However, he said "it did not influence what we recommended".

In March 2026, YouTuber Pete Zogoulas and far-right activist Drew Pavlou investigated alleged fraud and abuse within the NDIS. Their investigations have examined NDIS providers in areas with high concentrations of registered businesses, including allegations of overcharging, providers operating from inactive premises, and businesses continuing to operate after previous providers had been banned. In one investigation, the pair arranged an NDIS-funded cleaning service that lasted approximately 25 minutes but resulted in an invoice for two hours of work; after the journalists questioned the provider, the invoice was reportedly reduced from A$236 to A$24. Their investigations have attracted political attention, with some Australian MPs such as Rebekha Sharkie discussing their findings in Parliament. On 23 March 2026, Pauline Hanson called for a Senate inquiry into "waste, fraud and abuse" within the NDIS and argued that stronger safeguards and potentially a royal commission were needed. She said the scheme had been poorly protected against fraud and that taxpayers were bearing the cost.

== NDIS Quality and Safeguards Commission ==
The NDIS Quality and Safeguards Commission (NQSC) is the national agency tasked with regulating providers to the NDIS. This includes:

- protecting the safety of NDIS participants by coordinating nationally consistent screening of disability sector workers
- promoting the use of least restrictive practices as part of behaviour support plans
- investigating and prosecuting alleged unfair pricing strategies of NDIS-funded supports
- enforcing provider compliance with the NDIS Code of Conduct and standards
- ensuring NDIS-funded supports are safe and high-quality

=== Restrictive practices and behaviour support ===
Under the National Disability Insurance Scheme (Restrictive Practices and Behaviour Support) Rules 2018, five types of regulated restrictive practice are recognised: seclusion, and chemical, mechanical, physical and environmental restraint. A regulated restrictive practice may be used only as a last resort in response to a risk of harm to the person or others, must be the least restrictive option available, and must be included in a behaviour support plan developed by a behaviour support practitioner whom the commission has assessed as suitable. It must also be authorised under the relevant state or territory process. Providers must report each use to the commission monthly, and use of a regulated restrictive practice without authorisation or outside a behaviour support plan is a reportable incident.

The commission's general complaints role is described below.

The commission does not regulate administrative decisions of the National Disability Insurance Agency, such as plan budgets or participant eligibility. NDIS participants have the right to submit complaints to the commission where they are concerned about the safety or quality of supports received under NDIS funding.

The commission began its regulatory operations in July 2018 when it acquired jurisdiction for NDIS services in New South Wales and South Australia. Its jurisdiction expanded to include Queensland, the ACT, Victoria, Tasmania and the Northern Territory in July 2019. In December 2020, the commission became a national regulator when it gained oversight of the NDIS in Western Australia.
