= Toora Women =

Australian non-profit organisation

Toora Women Inc.
- Type: Non Government Organisation
- VAT ID no.: 11 099 754 393
- CEO: Kellie Friend
- Website: www.toora.org.au

Toora Women is an Australian non-profit, non-governmental organisation based in the Australian Capital Territory assisting women and children facing homelessness. Toora Women is funded by the Australian Government and the ACT Government to provide homelessness and substance abuse services for women across the Australian Capital Territory. Services include short-term, emergency accommodation, long-term accommodation, case support and rehabilitation.

== History ==
Toora Women was founded in the 1980s in response to the issue of homeless single women in Canberra. The organisation founded Toora Wimmins Shelter (presently Toora House) based on a set of feminist values and principles to ensure quality services were provided to women.

The roots of Toora Women was the Single Women's Shelter collective, which in turn had grown from the grew out of the Canberra Women's Refuge. The Single Women's Shelter was funded by the ACT Government during the early 1980s. Following the closure of the collective, Toora Women was formed.

== Programs and Services ==
The organisation's main programs are:

- Toora House (originally Toora Wimmins Shelter), established in the 1980s.
- The Coming Home Program, established in 2010 in alliance with Canberra Rape Crisis and Beryl Women’s Refuge.
- Lesley’s Place, established in 2002, to address the needs of women with substance abuse issues. The program offers crisis accommodation and rehab.
- Marzenna House, providing long-term accommodation and rehab.

== People ==
Ara Cresswell, CEO of Carers Australia, was the former Executive Director for Toora Women.

== Stances ==
Toora Women argued against the Australian Government's NDIS funding model, stating that the NDIS' competitive model would be detrimental to the homelessness service system with no guarantee of better outcomes.

== See also ==
- Homelessness in Australia
