= 2013 Australian federal budget =

Australian federal budget 2013–14
- Submitted: 14 May 2013
- Submitted by: Gillard government
- Submitted to: Parliament of Australia
- Country: Australia
- Parliament: 43rd
- Party: Australian Labor Party
- Treasurer: Wayne Swan
- Total revenue: $373.9 billion
- Total expenditures: $398.3 billion
- Program spending: $413.8 billion (26.1% of GDP)
- Deficit: $48.5 billion (3.1% of GDP)
- Debt: $202.5 billion (12.8% of GDP)
- Website: 2013–14 Commonwealth Budget

The 2013 Australian federal budget for the Australian financial year ended 30 June 2014 was presented on 14 May 2013 by the Treasurer of Australia, Wayne Swan, the sixth federal budget presented by Swan. The 2013 budget estimated total revenue of A$387.7 billion and spending of A$398.3 billion, a deficit of A$18 billion, with a return to surplus expected in the 2015 Australian federal budget (FY 2015–16). Some of the measures in the budget had been announced by various Ministers before the budget.

According to Swan the budget was being impacted by both global economic uncertainty and the high Australian dollar. It features significant spending on disability services and a school improvement program based on the Gonski Report. In an unusual step the election year budget contains 10-year forward estimates for the school and disability programs in an attempt to ensure funding is available. To pay for DisabilityCare Australia the Medicare levy was increased from 1.5 to 2% of taxable income from 1 July 2014.

The budget was described as big spending but low taxing. It lacked any big surprises or so-called election sweeteners.

== Forecasts ==
=== Deficit ===
The budget was not expected to decrease government spending dramatically in an effort to quickly return to surplus. Swan has claimed that such a move would result in rising unemployment and slowing economic growth. A collapse in the price of carbon under the European Union Emission Trading Scheme means a return to surplus is unlikely in the following two federal budgets.

The forecasted current account deficit is lower than the average for the past couple of decades allowing Standard and Poor's assessment of Australia's bond credit rating to remain at the AAA rating.

=== Shortfall ===
Tax revenue declines made it clear in late 2012 that the Gillard government's promised 2013 budget surplus would not eventuate. In the lead up to the budget announcement an estimate of a $17.5 billion decline in forecast revenue was calculated after Finance Minister Penny Wong released government figures. Most of this shortfall was attributed to company tax and the mining tax.

A deficit of up to $10 billion in the 2013–14 financial was predicted by some economists. In early May 2013, the Parliamentary Budget Office forecast that the Minerals Resource Rent Tax (MRRT) would only raise $800 million this year instead of $3 billion which was originally expected.

== Revenues ==
=== Taxation ===
In March 2013, Prime Minister Julia Gillard indicated an increase on the tax on superannuation contributions was likely. On 1 May 2013, Gillard announced a 0.5% increase of the Medicare levy to fund DisabilityCare Australia which will take effect on 1 July 2014, and which is expected to raise $11 billion over four years.

The budget included measures to counter tax avoidance by closing a loophole in which companies claim large tax deductions after increasing their Australian operations with debt.

A$2,000 cap on tax deductions for work-related education expense was introduced in the budget.

== Expenditure ==
=== General government ===
A few days before the budget was delivered, Treasurer Swan announced the public service was to receive a $580 million reduction in funding over four years. Expenditure on asylum seekers was forecast to be $2.9 billion, an increase of $930 million over previous year, as arrivals were expected to reach a record high.

=== Social security and welfare ===
Included in the introduction of the Minerals Resource Rent Tax was an increase in the Family Tax Benefit Part A scheme. Finance Minister Penny Wong announced the cancellation of the increase prior to the release of the 2013 budget. It was intended to be a measure that would spread the wealth of the mining boom, however as revenue from that tax was significantly lower than expected, the payment had to be scrapped. The increase in the benefit was expected to go to around 1.5 million families.

The baby bonus was abolished and replaced with a family tax benefit equivalent to less than half of the then-current payment. The payment was to cease on 1 March 2014, reducing expenditure by $1.1 billion over five years, and being replaced with an increase in family tax benefits which will be means-tested and limited to $2,000 for the first born and $1,000 for subsequent children.

The budget didn't contain a raise in the Newstart Allowance despite widespread calls for its increase. Instead the amount of money the unemployed may earn before it affects welfare payments was increased. The change was estimated to cost $258 million over four years.

$99.4 million was provided for a new Farm Household Allowance for eligible farmers facing hardship, replacing the previous Exceptional Circumstances Relief Payment and Transitional Farm Family Payment. The payment will begin on 1 July 2014 and be equivalent to the Newstart Allowance. A farm finance scheme is to be introduced which will support farmers in debt.

=== Infrastructure, transport and energy ===
$400 million was provided for the construction of an eight km tunnel linking the Sydney–Newcastle Freeway and M2 Hills Motorway in Sydney. $3 billion worth of funding out of a total cost of $8 billion for the Melbourne Metro Rail Project rapid transit rail project was allocated in the budget on the condition that Victoria fund an equal amount. $715 million was committed to the Cross River Rail project in Brisbane. Queensland's Transport Minister Scott Emerson was expecting twice as much for a 50–50 cost shared between federal and state governments.

=== Education ===
The Australian Indigenous Education Foundation was provided with an additional $22 million. Bonuses paid to those who pay their HECS debts up-front or voluntarily will cease, saving $237 million.

=== Defence ===
The budget provided funding for new 12 radar-jamming Growler Super Hornet fighter aircraft. Overall spending on defence is up $10 billion compared to the previous year.

=== Health ===
"For the first time in Australian history, disability is at the centre of the federal budget, and for people with disability that's a key result,"

— Disability Discrimination Commissioner Graham Innes

The net medical expenses tax offset is to be phased out over two years. A total of $14.3 billion worth of new funding was allocated to DisabilityCare Australia.

=== Community services and culture ===
The cost of 457 temporary skilled migrant visas was doubled to $900.

== Opposition and crossbench response ==
Opposition treasury spokesman Joe Hockey described the budget as "fundamentally dishonest". Tony Abbott claimed Julia Gillard was in denial over whether or not there was a spending problem. Australian Greens leader Christine Milne said the budget lacked vision and was a disappointment to rural communities.

== Reception ==
Even before the budget was released the business community, as represented by the Business Council of Australia, the Australian Industry Group, the Australian Chamber of Commerce and Industry and the Minerals Council of Australia, complained the budget would be lacking in both transparency and credibility and was achieved without genuine consultation. Australian Education Union President Angelo Gavrielatos praised the school reforms saying they would benefit children and the nation as a whole. The Federation of Ethnic Communities Councils of Australia supported the governments intention to maintain permanent migration and humanitarian intake levels as they were. Asylum seekers advocates questioned the expense of off-shore detention centres and processing. Indigenous organisations reacted with a mixed response.

Some columnists questioned whether the forecast revenue would be as high as predicted especially considering the effect of a high Australian dollar. The assumption that Australia's gross domestic product will grow by 5% per year was also questioned. Representatives from the National Welfare Rights Network and the National Council of Single Mothers and their Children criticised the lack of an increase in dole payments, particularly after many single mothers were transferred to Newstart in January.

== See also ==
- Australian government debt
- Economy of Australia
