= George Burniston =

(1914–1992) medical practitioner

George Burniston OBE CMG
- Born: 23 November 1914; Campsie, New South Wales, Australia
- Died: 27 June 1992 (aged 77); Bangkok, Thailand
- Education: University of Sydney
- Years active: 1939–1985
- Partner: Don Dobie
- Medical career
- Profession: Physician
- Institutions: Prince of Wales Hospital; University of New South Wales
- Sub-specialties: Rehabilitation medicine

George Garrett Burniston OBE CMG (23 November 1914 – 27 June 1992) was an Australian physician who specialised in rehabilitation medicine. He had a long association with Prince of Wales Hospital in Sydney and the University of New South Wales, having earlier worked as a public servant with the Department of Post-War Reconstruction and Department of Social Services.

== Early life ==
Burniston was born on 23 November 1914 in Campsie, New South Wales. He was the son of Daisy Belle (née Boxwell) and George Benjamin Burniston; his father was a butcher. He attended Summer Hill Intermediate High School and Sydney Boys' High School. He matriculated to the University of Sydney in 1933, graduating MBBS in 1939.

== Medical career ==
Burniston began his career as a resident at Hornsby District Hospital. He joined the medical branch of the Royal Australian Air Force (RAAF) in 1940 and was soon seconded to the Royal Air Force's orthopaedic service in England, working under Reginald Watson-Jones and Henry Osmond-Clarke. He returned to Australia in July 1943 and the following year was appointed head of the No. 2 Convalescent Depot at Jervis Bay. After the war's end he worked for the Department of Post-War Reconstruction as deputy coordinator and acting coordinator of rehabilitation for disabled ex-service personnel in New South Wales.

In 1950, Burniston joined the Department of Social Services (DSS) as senior medical officer in New South Wales. He took a sabbatical in 1953, studying at New York University as a Fulbright fellow and at King’s College, London. He was promoted to principal medical officer in the DSS in 1954 and was also the chief medical officer for the Commonwealth Rehabilitation Service. Burniston helped expand the availability of rehabilitation programs from a focus on ex-military personnel to the general population. In 1954 he proposed a national plan for rehabilitating the physically handicapped.

Burniston was appointed director of rehabilitation medicine at Prince Henry and Prince of Wales Hospitals in 1963. He retired in 1979 but continued to work in an honorary capacity until 1985. He also became a senior lecturer at the University of New South Wales, securing accreditation from the Royal College of Physicians for his training program, in the absence of an Australian qualification. He then helped establish a local diploma of physical and rehabilitation medicine.

Burniston served terms as national president of the Australian Association of Physical Medicine and Rehabilitation (1959) and state president of the Australian Association of Occupational Therapists (1963–1969). He was the inaugural president of the Australasian Faculty of Rehabilitation Medicine (1980–1982), which subsequently became a faculty of the Royal Australasian College of Physicians. He was also a member of the World Health Organization's expert panel on rehabilitation medicine.

== Personal life ==
Burniston was in a long-term relationship with Don Dobie, a long-serving federal MP. The pair lived together from the 1950s, initially in Dobie's South Yarra flat and later in a seaside apartment at Cronulla. Outside of medicine he was also an amateur artist. He died in Bangkok on 27 June 1992 at the age of 77.

== Honours ==
Burniston was appointed Officer of the Order of the British Empire (OBE) in 1968 and Companion of the Order of St Michael and St George (CMG) in 1972. He was a fellow of the Royal Australasian College of Medical Administrators (1968), Royal Society of Health (1973), and Royal Australasian College of Physicians (1978). After his death, the Australasian Faculty of Rehabilitation Medicine established the George Burniston Oration in his honour.
