= Better Access Scheme =

Mental healthcare scheme run by the Australian government

The Better Access Scheme also known as the "Better Access to Psychiatrists, Psychologists and General Practitioners initiative" is a program of the Australian Government that provides subsidised mental health care to Australian residents. Under the scheme, General Practitioners (GPs), Paediatricians and Psychiatrists with a Medicare provider number are able to refer patients to eligible allied health practitioners for treatment of mental health conditions under Medicare. The scheme is a key component of health care in Australia and aims to improve the treatment and management of mental illness within the Australian community. The introduction of the Better Access scheme has provided over 30 million individual treatment services for Australians with mental health disorders since its inception.

== History ==
There were a number of events that raised the profile of mental health in Australia and culminated with the introduction of the Better Access initiative. Public interest in mental health was heightened in late 2005 by the publicity surrounding the inquiry into the wrongful detention of psychiatric patient Cornelia Rau as an illegal immigrant, and the release of the Mental Health Council of Australia's 'Not for Service' report.

A 2006 Senate inquiry into Australia's mental health system called for sweeping changes to mental health services. The Productivity Commission's report on Australia's health workforce was also released in January 2006 and identified a number of systemic problems relating to community access to mental health services as part of a National Action Plan for Mental Health. The commission's report recommended reforms in mental health service delivery and an extension of Medicare rebates to allied health professionals. The Council of Australian Governments (COAG) raised the issue of mental health as an issue of national significance in February 2006, resulting in the Australian Government announcing a $1.9 billion increase in funding for mental health services. As part of these COAG mental health reforms, the government announced the Better Access initiative for people with mental health disorders to access services from eligible allied health professionals.

The scheme built on some of the strengths of an earlier program, Better Outcomes in Mental Health Care, that was established in 2001. This program allowed GPs to claim for using psychological services after completing training in psychoeducation, interpersonal therapy and cognitive behavior therapy.

Better Access was launched in November 2006 by then Minister for Health and Ageing Tony Abbott after extensive consultation with the Australian Psychological Society and other mental health groups. The scheme initially provided 12 sessions per calendar year, delivered in two sets of 6 sessions, with 18 sessions available in exceptional circumstances. Additionally, the scheme allowed for 12 group treatment sessions per calendar year for those in a group with 6 to 10 patients. However, this was subsequently reduced to 10 individual and 10 group treatment sessions per calendar year in November 2011. The reduction in the number of sessions available under the scheme was strongly opposed by psychologists and community members.

=== Telehealth services ===
In November 2017, the Australian Government announced $9.1 million in funding to improve access to mental health treatment services for people in regional, rural and remote areas. Eligible patients with a Mental Health Treatment Plan or valid referral from a Paediatrician or Psychiatrist are able to claim rebates for psychological treatment via video consultations through the Better Access initiative. Telehealth services can be delivered by psychologists, occupational therapists and social workers.

=== Eating disorders ===
In December 2018, the Australian government announced expanded mental health treatment for patients with eating disorders. People with eligible eating disorders such as anorexia and bulimia will have access to a comprehensive plan through Medicare, including up to 40 subsidised psychological services and 20 dietetic services in a 12 month period. The Prime Minister Scott Morrison announced that $110 million in funding would be rolled out over four years as part of the Medicare package.

== Impact on the psychology profession ==
Under the Better Access program clients of psychologists with a general registration receive a rebate of $87.45 for sessions of 50+ minutes. Clients of psychologists endorsed in Clinical Psychology are rebated $128.40 for 50+ minute sessions. The disparity in rebates has led to the formation of a new professional association called the Australian Association of Psychologists (AAPi), who advocate for fairness in the profession across all types of psychologists and areas of psychology, and improve access to mental services to the population.

Since the introduction of the Better Access Scheme in 2006 and the two-tier rebate system, there has been a significant increase in student demand for places in clinical psychology postgraduate programs compared to other psychology postgraduate programs. With the exception of clinical psychology, all psychology postgraduate programs leading to an area of practice endorsement have dramatically declined including those in counselling, community, health, forensic, educational and developmental and sport and exercise psychology. In contrast, Master of Professional Psychology programs have significantly increased over the same period.

== Criticisms ==
There have been several criticisms of the Better Access initiative since its inception. Psychiatrist Ian Hickie has raised concerns over the scheme, stating that giving psychologists Medicare rebates risks turning the profession into a “cottage industry”. Hickie has previously advocated that multidisciplinary teams are the best way to deliver higher-quality mental health care and for the Better Access scheme to be capped at 10 sessions per calendar year. Sebastian Rosenberg, Senior Lecturer at the Brain and Mind Centre, has also been critical of the reduced oversight of General Practitioners in the scheme, suggesting “GPs have allowed their role in Better Access to dwindle to that of glorified referrers”. The Brain and Mind Centre has estimated the cost of expanding access to the scheme at $2 billion and has suggested funding for mental health services could be better spent elsewhere. However, supporters of the scheme point out that mental health is estimated to cost the economy more than $60 billion annually in lost productivity and that Better Access has been enormously successful in providing accessible, effective, and relatively low cost mental health services, particularly for people with high-prevalence disorders such as depression and anxiety.

A prominent concern of the Better Access initiative is its limited distribution of mental health care to rural, regional and remote areas. Better Access activity rates are typically greater in urban and more advantaged areas. However, this same criticism has also been leveled at other mental health services. Among psychiatrists, only one-third of the rural workforce live in rural Australia with most travelling from cities or using telepsychiatry. Activity rates for Better Access Medicare items across all practitioners decline with increasing remoteness.

There is also considerable variability between provider disciplines and Medicare items within the scheme, leading some critics to cite quality control issues. This is particularly the case with the psychologist service providers leading to much acrimony within the profession. This acrimony has manifested primarily in groups like RAPS publishing claims on social media that young female psychology students were offering sexual favours in exchange for votes supporting the APS College of Clinical Psychologists in APS elections, and statements of support for psychologists under investigation by AHPRA for publicly asserting that newly graduated clinical psychologists were "bumbling fools stumbling over their textbooks".

The Australian Association of Social Workers (AASW) and Occupational Therapists Australia have called for a change in the official title of the initiative, pointing out that the existing title neglects the role of social workers and occupational therapists. The AASW has argued that the existing title may mislead clients into assuming that Medicare rebateable services are only provided by Psychiatrists, Psychologists and General Practitioners under the initiative.

== See also ==
- Medicare (Australia)
- Medicare (Canada)
- Medicare (United States)
- Healthdirect Australia
