= Justin Yerbury =

Australian molecular biologist (1974–2023)

Justin John Yerbury AM
- Born: 3 May 1974; Wollongong, New South Wales, Australia
- Died: 28 July 2023 (aged 49); Australia
- Cause of death: Motor neurone disease
- Education: BSc (Hons 1st class), University of Wollongong; PhD, University of Wollongong
- Occupation: Molecular biologist
- Spouse: Rachel
- Children: 2
- Medical career
- Institutions: Illawarra Health and Medical Research Institute (IHMRI), University of Wollongong
- Sub-specialties: Research into the causes of MND
- Research: Protein misfolding and protein homeostasis
- Awards: The Australian Society for Medical Research Young Investigator Award, 2004; Bill Gole Postdoctoral MND Research Fellowship, 2009; Vice Chancellor's Emerging Researcher of the Year award, 2011; Lorne Conference on Protein Structure and Function Young Investigator Prize, 2012; MND Australia Betty Laidlaw MND Research Prize for 2017; University of New South Wales Eureka Prize for Scientific Research, 2022

Justin John Yerbury AM (3 May 1974 – 28 July 2023) was an Australian molecular biologist who was spurred to follow a career in biological research when he discovered that his family has the genetic form of motor neurone disease (MND). He held the position of Professor in Neurodegenerative Disease at the University of Wollongong. He was diagnosed with MND himself in 2016, but continued to research until his death from the disease in 2023.

== Education and career ==
Yerbury grew up in Wollongong, New South Wales, where he attended Oak Flats High School in the southern suburb of Oak Flats. He graduated in 1991. He later said that he "was not much of a scientist at school." He studied for a Bachelor of Commerce and helped to run the family business.

In 1995, Yerbury played two games for the Illawarra Hawks in the National Basketball League (NBL).

In the late 1990s, several members of Yerbury's extended family were diagnosed and died from motor neurone disease (MND, also known as amyotrophic lateral sclerosis (ALS) or Lou Gehrig's disease). Ninety to 95 per cent of cases are considered sporadic, occurring randomly in the population. The remaining 5–10% of cases are hereditary. Mutations of more than twelve genes have been found to cause the disease. Using genealogical information, Yerbury traced suspected cases of motor neuron disease in his family to at least 1920 and possibly further back. He was prompted to return to university studies to further understand the disease.

In 2004 Yerbury obtained a BSc with 1st class honours from the University of Wollongong. He received his PhD from the university in 2008 for a thesis entitled Characterisation of novel extracellular molecular chaperones and their effects on amyloid formation. He worked as a research assistant, lecturer and research fellow during his studies. During 2008 and 2009 he was an Australian Research Council (ARC) International Linkage Fellow at the University of Cambridge, UK. Yerbury became a Discovery Early Career Researcher Award (DECRA) Postdoctoral Fellow at the University of Wollongong in 2012. He spent the rest of his life studying the disease which affects around 2,000 Australians, alongside his team at the Illawarra Health and Medical Research Institute (IHMRI), based at the University of Wollongong.

== Personal life and death ==
Yerbury first knew of MND when his uncle was diagnosed in 1994. A cousin was diagnosed and died in 1997; he was 21 years old. During a six-week period in 2002 his mother, grandmother and aunt all died. Fifty per cent of Yerbury's family carry a faulty SOD1 gene. His youngest sister died from MND at 26 years old. Yerbury and his sister, Naomi, were tested for the gene; Naomi was clear but Yerbury's test was positive.

Yerbury was diagnosed with MND in 2016. His condition stabilised at first but he later required around-the-clock care and had a ventilator to allow him to breathe. He was initially denied a suitable wheelchair and house modifications under the National Disability Insurance Scheme (NDIS), sparking an online crowdfunding campaign. After coming to the attention of Federal Labor MP Sharon Bird, he was provided with an appropriate wheelchair and some home modifications under the scheme. Yerbury's public profile also highlighted others who encountered difficulties with the NDIS.

In January 2018 Yerbury's condition deteriorated significantly, and he underwent a tracheostomy, necessitating ventilation. To further facilitate his life support he also had a laryngectomy which left him unable to speak. He then began to communicate by lip reading and using voice software coordinated by eye-gaze on his laptop computer. After this surgery, he spent six months in hospital recovering from complications. In November 2018 he had returned home and began attending his office two days a week to continue his research.

In April 2017 Yerbury met physicist and cosmologist Stephen Hawking, who lived with MND for over fifty years until his death in 2018. They discussed living with the disease and Yerbury's research.

Yerbury was married to Rachel Yerbury. They have two daughters, born 1996 and 1998.

In March 2019 Yerbury, his family and carers were turned away from a planned cruise to New Caledonia because of a perceived "disability risk". After media attention the cruise company apologised to the family and refunded fees and costs.

In December 2019 QANTAS airlines co-operated with the Yerbury family to provide an appropriate hoist to enable him to travel by plane to Perth, WA for a family holiday and to enable Yerbury to present his research at the 30th International Symposium on ALS/MND.

In 2020, Yerbury successfully appealed the rejection of an NHMRC Investigator Grant after arguing that assessors had not adequately considered the effect of his disability on his research output. His appeal prompted the NHMRC to revise its "Relative to Opportunity" policy to explicitly include disability and illness as factors affecting an applicant's research record.

In late 2022 he was hospitalised with a collapsed lung and his health subsequently declined until his death, aged 49, at his home on 28 July 2023.

== Research ==
Yerbury researched potential effective treatments for MND. His research interests included protein misfolding, aggregation and neurodegenerative disease, protein aggregation and neuro-inflammation and the Propagation of protein misfolding, and protein homeostasis and Motor Neurone Disease. He was active in sharing his research not only with the academic community but also with those with MND and their families.

Yerbury had 55 research articles listed in PubMed and over 100 in Google Scholar in addition to many conference and other presentations.

== Awards ==
- The Australian Society for Medical Research Young Investigator Award, 2004
- Bill Gole Postdoctoral MND Research Fellowship, 2009
- Vice Chancellor's Emerging Researcher of the Year award, 2011
- Lorne Conference on Protein Structure and Function Young Investigator Prize, 2012
- MND Australia Betty Laidlaw MND Research Prize for 2017
- Wollongong's Citizen of the Year, Australia Day Awards 2019
- Member of the Order of Australia in the 2020 Australia Day Honours for "significant service to education and research in the field of biological sciences"
- University of New South Wales Eureka Prize for Scientific Research, 2022
- NSW Premier's Prizes for Science & Engineering: Excellence in Medical Biological Sciences, 2022
