= Mental health in Australia =

Mental health in Australia involves state, private and community sector intervention in mental health issues. 20% of Australians experiences one or more mental health episodes in their lifetime. Australia runs on a mixed health care system, with both public and private health care. The public system includes a government run insurance scheme called Medicare, which aids mental health schemes. Each state within Australia has its own management plans for mental health treatment. However, the overarching system and spending remains the same.

== History ==
Australia largely instituted a British system of managing mental health, after the arrival of the First Fleet in 1788. Australia had its first psychiatric facility in 1811. Prior to that, individuals with mental illnesses were placed together with convicts and criminals.

One of the key moments in Australia's history of mental health care, was its so-called deinstitutionalisation in New South Wales. This came about after the Richmond Report was released in 1983. This report investigated rumours of abuse and injustices towards patients of psychiatric institutions. Controversies over whether the report did any good remain.

The first National Mental Health Care Plan was introduced in 1992. There have been six national mental health care plans. The Fifth National Mental Health and Suicide Prevention Plan was endorsed by the COAG Health Council in 2017 to guide reform between 2017 and 2022. In 2021 the Australian Government released the National Mental Health and Suicide Prevention Plan, a $2.3 billion package responding to the Productivity Commission inquiry into mental health.

Despite the fact that Australia has been celebrated for its sophisticated mental health management systems, a wide range of issues remain. The Australian Medical Association (AMA) reported in the 2018 mental health review that "Australia lacks an overarching mental health 'architecture'. There is no agreed national design or structure that facilitates prevention or proper care for people with mental illness." While the organisation noted that youth mental health care was fairly successful, it believed that the status of treatment for adults was severely lacking. The AMA argued that the Australian government lacked a structural plan for mental health management and that the future of mental health treatment in Australia was in a dangerous position.

The Australian government spent $9.1 billion on mental health related services in 2017. This averages to $375 per person, a rise from $359 in the year prior. In 2016–2017, 7.4% of the Australian government's health expenditure went towards mental health services. Critics have requested an increase in funding, claiming that the mental health budget is far too small. In 2015, mental health accounted for 5.2% of the overall yearly health budgeting, although mental health equated to 12% of the total burden of disease.

== Demographics ==
Pie chart displaying the proportion of the Australian population to experience a mental disorder in their lifetime
1. No Lifetime mental disorder (55.0%)
2. Mental disorder for 12 months or less (25.0%)
3. Mental disorder for more than 12 months (20.0%)
4. Other (0.00%)

It is estimated that 45% of Australian adults, roughly 8.6 million, will experience a mental disorder within their lives. Additionally, 3.2 million Australians had a mental disorder that has lasted for more than 12 months. The most prevalent mental disorders were anxiety disorders, affective disorders and substance use disorders. 14.4% of Australia's population suffered from anxiety disorders, which were more common in females. 6.2% of the population suffers from an affective disorder, with an equal gender balance. Substance use disorders affected 5.1% of the population, with men overrepresented. (7.7% for males and 3.3% for females). Other than cannabis, the most prevalent forms of substance use disorder in Australia have been addictions to opioids and amphetamines. The Australian Health and Wellbeing Institute reported in 2015 that 14% (560,000) of children and adolescents experience mental health disorders.

In terms of other mental disorders, Bipolar I Disorder is estimated to affect about 1% of the population with Bipolar II Disorder affecting roughly 5% of the population. Bipolar disorder affects 3.3% of men in their lifetime. However, experts suspect the number is far higher due to a large volume of undiagnosed cases. Mood disorders have been noted to affect females more than men, with 7.1% and 5.3% respectively.

The Mental Health Services 2018 Report released by the Australian Institute of Health and Welfare produced a wide spectrum of new statistics about the Australian population. Four point two million people or 16.5% of the population received mental health related prescriptions during 2017–2018, Seventy per cent of the prescriptions were for antidepressant medications. Tasmania had the highest proportion of those prescriptions at 22%; the smallest proportion was the Northern Territory at 9%.

In terms of general practice (GP) consultations, 12.4% were mental health related from 2015–2016. Depression was reported to be the most common mental health diagnosis, with a precedence estimated at 1 in 3 people. Medication was the most common treatment recommendation, given in 61% of encounters.

Additionally, reports released by the Australian Health and Wellbeing Institute found that 1 in 3 Indigenous people experience high or very high levels of psychological distress. Indigenous individuals are 1.3 times more likely to be managed by general practitioners, in comparison with other Australian individuals.

The prevalence of both depression and perinatal depression within the population of mothers in Australia has been noted by health organisations as rather high, with depression seen in 20% of mothers with children aged 24 months or less. Perinatal Depression was found in half of that group. These figures equate to 110,000 mothers with depression and 56,000 with perinatal depression. The report found that a majority of mothers went for treatment from a GP or a mental health organisation/treatment provider.

=== Mental health of Indigenous Australians ===
In 2010, the rate of high or very high levels of psychological distress for Aboriginal and Torres Strait Islander adults was more than twice that of non-Indigenous Australians. A 2007 study in The Lancet found that the four greatest preventable contributions to the Indigenous mental health burden of disease were: alcohol consumption, illicit drugs, child sexual abuse and intimate partner violence. Up to 15% of the 10 year life expectancy gap compared to non-Indigenous Australians has been attributed to mental health disorders.

Research indicates that Indigenous Australian concepts of health and illness differ from the Western biomedical perspective, which diagnoses illness through individual physical symptoms. A biosocial approach has been proposed, one that recognises how cultural identity, community connections and historical experiences shape health outcomes. Within this framework, mental health is understood as a part of social and emotional wellbeing, linking kinship, spirituality, relationship with the land and cultural obligations. Healing may therefore involve community involvement or restoring historical gaps, and only later drawing on biomedical treatment such as counselling or medication.

Mental health, suicide and self-harm remain major concerns, with the suicide rate being double that of the non-Indigenous population in 2015, and young people experiencing rising mental health rates. A 2017 article in The Lancet described the suicide rate among Indigenous Australians as a "catastrophic crisis":

In 2015, more than 150 Indigenous people died by suicide, the highest figure ever recorded nationally and double the rate of non-Indigenous people, according to the Australian Bureau of Statistics. Additionally, Indigenous children make up one in three child suicides despite making up a minuscule percentage of the population. Moreover, in parts of the country such as Kimberley, WA, suicide rates among Indigenous people are among the highest in the world.

The report advocates Indigenous-led national response to the crisis, asserting that suicide prevention programmes have failed this segment of the population. These statistics are influenced by multiple factors in addition to biomedicine. They can be understood through an alternative body politic in which Indigenous health is interconnected with histories of colonisation, racism and social inequality.These conditions constitute structural violence, disrupting cultural continuity and community cohesion, contributing to high rates of mental illness. Intergenerational trauma from the Stolen Generations has further worsened these conditions, resulting in high incidences of anxiety, depression, PTSD and suicide which has resulted in unstable parenting and family situations.

A mistrust of Western psychiatry persists among Indigenous people, partly due to past segregation policies that removed people from their families and communities, imposing treatment without cultural understandings. This has shaped public discourse and reinforced biomedical framings of mental health that often overlook Indigenous perspectives. Research identifies cultural consonance as a contributing factor to mental well-being, referring to the degree to which individuals' lives align with cultural values and community obligations.

The 2019 ABS data showed that about 24% of Indigenous people, including children with 23% of males and 25% of females distribution, experienced mental health issues. The survey indicated that anxiety is the most common condition with females suffering at 21% and males at a lower, 12%. Studies suggest that culturally grounded, community-led responses to mental health can complement biomedical care, recognising both the statistics and lived experiences of Indigenous Australians.

=== Suicide ===
In 2015, suicides reached a 13 year high with 3,027 Australians taking their own life. "The male suicide rate ranged from a high of 5.6 times that of females in 1930 to lows of less than twice the female rate in the 1960s and early 1970s—mainly due to the marked rise in female suicide rates at this time. Since then, the male suicide rate has fluctuated around 3–4 times that of the female rate". It is the number one cause of death of people aged 15 to 44. The Australian Bureau of Statistics reports that nearly eight people commit suicide in Australia every day.

== Treatment ==
In the last ten years, Australia has made a range of improvements towards treatment for mental health. In 2006, Medicare adapted the benefits schedule to prioritise mental health treatment, with a large increase in the portion of treatment plans prescribed. There were 1.3 million mental health treatment plans prescribed by general practitioners and 4.95 million by psychologist related services. The proportion of individuals that sought out mental health treatment doubled between 1997 and 2007.

Australia's key strategy in mental health planning comes down to: first point of contact. Mental health care providers and treaters are focused making the first point of contact the most significant/impactful. Hence, the main recommendation offered by government health organisations, is for the patient to visit their general practitioner. The aim of this is to prevent further harm or damage coming to the patient and to be able to create a personalised mental health treatment plan for the individual patient.

== Government supported treatment providers ==
=== Medicare Mental Health ===
Medicare Mental Health is an online and hotline service designed to assist individuals struggling with mental health issues; all responders are trained health professionals. Medicare Mental Health also has provided over 408 resources for individuals that are struggling, including websites, online programs, apps, forums and the hotline services.

=== Open Arms ===
Open Arms is an organisation aimed at helping veterans and families of veterans with mental trauma, providing assistance and resources. Open Arms is managed by the Department of Veterans' Affairs (DVA) and runs a range of online programs to meet different individual's needs.

=== Beyond Blue ===
Beyond Blue is an organisation that works with individuals struggling from a wide range of mental health issues, mainly: substance abuse disorders, depression disorders and anxiety related disorders. Beyond Blue aims to educate the Australian public about mental health and provide the skills to protect it. The mission statement of Beyond Blue is as follows "We're here for everyone in Australia – at work, home, school, university, online, and in communities across the country." Beyond Blue operates their helpline 24/7 and provides a brief 20-minute consultation for anyone.

=== Headspace ===
Headspace is aimed at aiding adolescents (12–25-year-olds) with issues surrounding mental health. Headspace offers counselling services as the main point of treatment. A key focus is early intervention, to prevent mental illness having a long-lasting impact on an individual's life. Headspace is one of Australia's leading mental health organisations, with over 100 locations across the country, all of which are either free or low cost. Headspace has also launched a further initiative focused on aiding students – Headspace Student Support.

=== Be You ===
Be You is a mental health organisation focused on preventing problems and supporting children's mental health. Their vision is as follows "every learning community is positive, inclusive and resilient – a place where every child, young person, educator and family can achieve their best possible mental health."

=== Lifeline Australia ===
Lifeline is Australia's main suicide prevention hotline and is a registered charity, providing support services and accepting calls 24/7. Lifeline receives a new call every minute from somewhere in Australia. Individuals call Lifeline about a range of mental health problems including: anxiety, stress, depression and suicidal thoughts. The main Lifeline number is: 13 11 14

=== Healthdirect ===
Healthdirect serves as a portal providing information about Australia's health services and general information about illnesses. Under the Mental Health disorders sub-category, Healthdirect links to a range of other Australian organisations designed to cover a wide range of patient needs.

=== National Mental Health Commission ===
National Mental Health Commission is an organisation that reports on the current status of Australia's mental health support system. The National Mental Health Commission's mission statement "is to give mental health and suicide prevention national attention, to influence reform and to help people live contributing lives by reporting, advising and collaborating."

=== OzHelp Foundation ===
OzHelp Foundation is a non-profit organisation aimed at industry and workplaces, focused on preventing mental illness and improving mental wellbeing of employees. The mission of the OzHelp Foundation is: "OzHelp continue to strive towards improving the mental health and wellbeing of people in the workforce and the wider community."

=== ReachOut Australia ===
ReachOut Australia is the country's leading online mental health service for young people, providing early intervention resources, peer support forums, and practical fact sheets co-designed with young Australians. Established in 1998 as an initiative of the Inspire Foundation, ReachOut was the world's first online mental health service for young people, and has since supported millions of Australians navigating mental health challenges.

ReachOut receives Australian Government funding as a recognised digital mental health service. In the 2021–22 Federal Budget, the Australian Government committed $13.1 million to ReachOut's core youth service, which had supported more than 3.6 million Australians in the preceding year. ReachOut has also submitted evidence to the Productivity Commission's Inquiry into the Social and Economic Benefits of Improving Mental Health, providing independently peer-reviewed data on its impact on youth depression, anxiety and suicide risk. Further submissions have been made to the Parliament of Australia on youth mental health and online safety, including data showing 570 duty-of-care interventions conducted in a single year.

A 2020 peer-reviewed longitudinal study published in JMIR Mental Health, involving 1,982 ReachOut users tracked over 12 weeks, found statistically significant reductions in symptoms of depression, anxiety and stress, as well as a reduction in the proportion of participants at high risk of suicide.

== See also ==
- Mental health
- Health care in Australia
- Suicide in Australia
