= Ivor Yerbury =

Ivor Milsom Yerbury was Archdeacon of Antigua from 1959 until 1967.

Yerbury was ordained in 1935. After a curacy in Kingstown he was Priest in charge at Carriacou. Later he held incumbencies in Antigua before his appointment as Archdeacon.
