= Commonwealth Rehabilitation Service =

The Commonwealth Rehabilitation Service was an Australian Government body that provided rehabilitation and employment services to Australians with a disability from 1941 until 2015. At this time, the body was abolished and replaced with the more decentralised National Disability Insurance Scheme (NDIS) and Disability Employment Services (DES) networks.

== History ==
In 1941, the Curtin government established the Vocational Training Scheme for Invalid Pensioners. This body grew and became known by a variety of different names with the initials CRS. In 1948, it became the Commonwealth Rehabilitation Service. Its services were predominantly delivered from a small number of large facilities in capital cities.

George Burniston was the Chief Medical Officer of the organisation for a time.

In the late 1970s, the number of new migrants in Victoria accepting offers of CRS services were much lower than for non-migrants. In 1979 approximately 15% of new migrants accepted compared to 54% for non-migrants. A similar situation was found in other states.

In the mid-1980s, the CRS sold their large facilities, and established many smaller ones instead. For example, two large facilities in Sydney were replaced with 55 across NSW.

By 1984, the proportion of new migrants accepting offers of CRS assistance dramatically increased (and became close to the level for non-migrants), with a 45% acceptance rate compared to 50% for non-migrants.

In 1986, the Disability Services Act (1986) was passed, and the CRS adopted a case management approach.

In 1987, the CRS was allowed to operate a Trust Account, and retain money from financial year to financial year, giving it more flexibility in its operation.

Also that year, the organisation founded the Community Living Program in Brisbane, helping disabled people to live outside of institutions. This later became an independent association, and now operates as the Community Living Association.

In the 1990s, the CRS began to work with employers to help prevent disabling injuries occurring. This was a time when state and territory government bodies had begun to do similar work.

The Granville Vocational Unit was established in Sydney in 1991. This provided rehabilitation for people with psychiatric injury in NSW, with the assistance of 50 Regional Units.

The book Back on Their Feet: A History of the Commonwealth Rehabilitation Service 1941-1991 was written by John Tipping and published by the CRS in 1992.

From 1992–93 to 1995–96, the CRS achieved a 57% increase in people commencing rehabilitation programmes and a 119% increase in people obtaining employment as a result of these programmes. During this time, its number of delivery units increased from 33 to 55, 11 of the new units being in regional areas. In 1995–96, 6911 people completed CRS rehabilitation programmes, of which 76% led to paid employment. In 1995, the CRS had 170 service delivery locations.

The Howard government's Commonwealth Rehabilitation Service Reform Act 1998 bill sought to corporatize the CRS but the bill was not passed into law by the parliament before the 1998 Federal election and was not reintroduced. The CRS therefore remained part of a department of state until its abolition. It was renamed CRS Australia. This was done to cease CRS' monopoly on many kinds of rehabilitation services, and develop commercial competitors in the field.

CRS Australia provided a national vocational rehabilitation and injury management service, helping people with a disability get and keep employment. Its services were free to people on a government pension or who could not otherwise pay. People who received insurance payments through government managed workplace or vehicle insurance schemes had their costs paid by the insurance. CRS also offered injury prevention services to businesses on a commercial basis.

In 1998, CRS Australia had 90 regional units and over 900 staff. The ratio of clients who were charged a fee to those who received their services free was about one to four.

In the July 2005 to June 2006 budget year, CRS Australia placed over 10,000 people in employment for the first time.

In 2011, the service had over 180 offices across the country.

In 2014, the Department of Social Services's "Disability Employment Services – Disability Management Service" had more than 75,000 participants. CRS Australia delivered 47% of this program. At this time, the work was opened to tender, and CRS Australia was made ineligible to bid for it.

Under the Abbott government, CRS Australia ceased delivering services at the end of Friday 27 February 2015. The nascent NDIS and DES took over its responsibilities.
