= NDIS Quality and Safeguards Commission =

Statutory body in Australia

Commission overview
- Formed: 13 December 2017 (legislated); 1 July 2018 (began operation)
- Jurisdiction: All Australian states and territories
- Annual budget: A$28.6 million (2020–21)
- Commission executives: Louise Glanville, Commissioner; Natalie Wade, Associate Commissioner
- Parent department: Department of Health, Disability and Ageing
- Website: ndiscommission.gov.au

The NDIS Quality and Safeguards Commission, also referred to as the NDIS Commission, is an independent commission that was established to improve the quality and safety of services funded by the National Disability Insurance Scheme. The NDIS Commission regulates NDIS providers, provides national consistency, promotes safety and quality services, resolves problems and identifies areas for improvement. The NDIS Commission commenced operations in New South Wales and South Australia on 1 July 2018, before expanding progressively across the nation where it now acts in all states and territories.

== Purpose ==
The NDIS Commission was created by an amendment to the National Disability Insurance Scheme Act (NDIS Act), passed by parliament in 2017. It was created in December 2017 to "improve the quality and safety of NDIS supports and services." The Commission exists as part of a federal agreement between the Australian Government and states and territory governments. This agreement is called the NDIS Quality and Safeguarding Framework and aligns the various quality and safeguard functions performed by each state and territory government during the initial rollout of the NDIS and includes additional investigative and regulatory powers. The NDIS Commission’s role is to manage complaints about NDIS providers, improve the quality and safety of NDIS supports and services, regulate NDIS service providers and workers, and lead education, capacity building and development for people with disability, NDIS providers and workers. The commission does not regulate the National Disability Insurance Agency (NDIA), which operates the NDIS scheme.

== Rollout ==
The NDIS Commission began operations across Australia in a staggered rollout that began in New South Wales and South Australia on 1 July 2018, followed by Queensland, the Australian Capital Territory, the Northern Territory, Victoria and Tasmania on 1 July 2019 and was completed in Western Australia on 1 December 2020. The Commission was originally planned to roll out to Western Australia on 1 July 2020; however, it was postponed by the state government until 1 December to create capacity for providers to focus on clinical care during the COVID-19 pandemic in Australia.

== Structure ==
The NDIS Commission is led by the NDIS Commissioner, Registrar and Chief Operating Officer. These three roles are supported by the Senior Practitioner, the Complaints Commissioner, Deputy Registrar, and General Counsel. The NDIS Commission falls under the portfolio of the Minister for the National Disability Insurance Scheme, although the Commission is largely independent from government.

=== Commissioners ===
The NDIS Quality and Safeguards Commissioner has overarching control over the NDIS Commission and is the legislated executor of powers given under the NDIS Act.

The inaugural NDIS Quality and Safeguards Commissioner was Graeme Head, who served as Commissioner from December 2017 until June 2021. Samantha Taylor served as the Acting Commissioner from July 2021 to January 2022. Tracy Mackey served as the NDIS Quality and Safeguards Commissioner from January 2022 to March 2024. Michael Phelan served as Interim NDIS Commissioner from March to September 2024, and Louise Glanville commenced as the new NDIS Quality and Safeguards Commissioner in October 2024, serving alongside Natalie Wade as Associate Commissioner.

== Workplace culture ==
In mid-2024 the Commission appointed Elizabeth Broderick & Co to conduct an independent review of workplace culture. The review ran from September 2024 to June 2025 and was published in August 2025. It was based on a confidential survey of 566 employees (about 56 per cent of the workforce), together with interviews, group sessions and written submissions."Broderick Review". NDIS Quality and Safeguards Commission.Benson, Rebecca (25 August 2025). "NDIS regulator in 'urgent need' of overhaul". Government News."Chapter 4 – NDIS Quality and Safeguards Commission". Joint Standing Committee on the National Disability Insurance Scheme. Parliament of Australia. The review found that Commission staff were highly engaged and shared a strong sense of purpose, and that some teams and offices had well-established positive cultures. It also reported that 21 per cent of surveyed employees had experienced bullying in the previous 12 months, most commonly intimidation and belittling or humiliating comments. Staff described public humiliation, verbal abuse and intimidation, including managers reprimanding junior staff in front of others and aggressive language from senior leaders. Of those who had experienced bullying, 71 per cent identified the perpetrator as their supervisor or another more senior person. Seventy per cent of employees who had made a complaint about harmful behaviours said they were dissatisfied with how the concern was handled. One quarter of employees believed their health had been negatively affected by working longer hours; among staff with five or more years of service the figure was 51 per cent. Only 70 per cent of employees with disability considered the Commission inclusive of people with disability, citing inaccessible systems, a lack of formal processes for workplace adjustments, and workplaces that did not consistently meet the needs of staff with disability.Myers, Emma (18 August 2025). "Workplace bullying uncovered by independent review". Powerd Media.Webber, Miriam (15 August 2025). "NDIS Commission review exposes the extent of bullying inside regulator". The Canberra Times. The review stated that the evidence reinforced “a compelling case for cultural transformation”. It made 16 recommendations on culture, leadership, disability inclusion and organisational processes and systems. The Commission accepted all recommendations and said they would be implemented through a Culture Roadmap and Action Plan. Commissioners Louise Glanville and Natalie Wade said the experiences recorded in the review largely reflected workplace culture under previous commissioners, and that recent investments in culture, systems, leadership and staff wellbeing had created a foundation for change. Australian Public Service Employee Census results have shown elevated rates of perceived bullying and harassment at the Commission compared with the APS average. Among medium-sized agencies, 18.9 per cent of Commission respondents in 2024 and 16.3 per cent in 2025 reported perceiving bullying or harassment in their current workplace, against an APS-wide rate of about 9.5–10.5 per cent."Bullying and harassment". State of the Service Report 2024–25. Australian Public Service Commission. Earlier census results cited by the Community and Public Sector Union included 16 per cent of staff reporting they had been bullied or harassed in the previous year, 24 per cent reporting burnout, 40 per cent disagreeing that change was managed well, and 55 per cent saying they would recommend the Commission as a good place to work. The union has described the Commission as having been a “toxic place to work” for years."Bullying and Burnout at NDIS". Community and Public Sector Union."NDIS Commission on the brink". The Saturday Paper. 14 October 2023. Comcare has issued improvement and inspection notices to the Commission concerning psychosocial hazards, including job demands and workload, from at least 2023. Subsequent notices have addressed incident-response procedures, psychosocial-hazard management and labour-hire arrangements. In response the Commission has published a Mental Health and Wellbeing Plan, undertaken a Commission-wide psychosocial hazard assessment, and developed a work health and safety action plan."Management of human resources". Annual Report 2023–24. NDIS Quality and Safeguards Commission."People strategies". Annual Report 2024–25. NDIS Quality and Safeguards Commission.
