= 2017 Australian federal budget =

Estimated revenues and expenditures by the government

Australian federal budget 2017
- Submitted: 9 May 2017
- Submitted by: Turnbull government
- Submitted to: House of Representatives
- Country: Australia
- Parliament: 45th
- Party: Liberal/National Coalition
- Treasurer: Scott Morrison
- Deficit: A$33.2 billion
- Website: budget.gov.au

The 2017 Australian federal budget was the federal budget to fund government services and operations for the 2017–18 financial year. The budget was presented to the House of Representatives by Treasurer Scott Morrison on 9 May 2017. It was the fourth budget to be handed down by the Liberal/National Coalition since their election to government at the 2013 federal election, and the second to be handed down by Morrison and the Turnbull government.

== Taxation ==
The Medicare levy was to be increased from 2% to 2.5% of taxable income, with effect on 1 July 2019. The proposed levy increase was scrapped on 25 April 2018.

A bank levy of 0.06% was imposed on the liabilities (ie., deposits) of the five biggest banks (Commonwealth Bank, Westpac, National Australia Bank, ANZ and Macquarie) and was expected to generate $6.2 billion over four years. The legislation passed parliament on 19 June and came into effect on 1 July 2017.

Broadcasting licence fees paid by free-to-air broadcasting networks were reduced by $90 million.

The "deficit levy" of 2% on personal incomes over $180,000 expired on 30 June 2017.

== Expenditure ==
Commonwealth funding for schools will increase by $18.6 billion over 10 years from 2017 to 2027. The Australian Government will invest $5.3 billion into the construction of the Second Sydney Airport over 4 years from 2017 to 2021.

== Education ==
University funding will be a reduced by 2.5%. University fees will go up by $2,000 to $3,600 for a four-year course, an increase of 1.8% in 2018, and 7.5% by 2022. From 1 July 2018, the income level at which HECS debt repayments start will be reduced, from $55,000 to $42,000.

== Health ==
Funding for hospitals will increase to $2.8 billion dollars over 4 years.
