= 2023 Australian federal budget =

- Submitted to: House of Representatives
- Presented: 9 May 2023
- Parliament: 47th Parliament
- Government: Albanese government
- Party: Australian Labor Party
- Treasurer: Jim Chalmers
- Total revenue: A$704.5 billion
- Total expenditures: A$685.9 billion
- Surplus: A$15.8 billion
- Debt: 34.0% (A$906.9 billion)
- Website: archive.budget.gov.au/2023-24/index.htm

The 2023 Australian federal budget was the federal budget to fund government services and operations. The budget was presented to the House of Representatives by Treasurer Jim Chalmers on 9 May 2023. It was the second budget handed down by the Australian Labor Party since their election to government in 2022.

== Background ==
Inflation was still well above the Reserve Bank of Australia's 2-3% target band. In the first quarter of 2023, the annual inflation rate slowed to 7.0%, from 7.8%. The International Monetary Fund had recently warned Jim Chalmers about the coming slow-down in the global economy. Concerns remained with the last two interest rate rises causing hardship for some households and the broader economy.

The budget was delivered during a period in which the rental market was described as a crisis. On 27 April 2023, Anglicare Australia released its annual report on rental affordability. Just 345 rentals (0.8%) were considered affordable to renters earning minimum wage. Homelessness Australia wanted the Commonwealth to increase the rent assistance payment by 50 per cent.

300 signatories signed an open letter urging the government to increase the rate of the JobSeeker, Youth Allowance and other payments in the next budget. The letter was co-signed by academics, business leaders, economists and politicians including Labor backbenchers. Prior to the budget's release the Australian Council of Social Service made calls to increase JobSeeker to $76 a day.

The Australian Medical Association called attention to emergency department and essential surgery waiting times in the lead up to the budget's release.

== Forecasts ==
The budget is forecast to deliver a surplus of $4 billion, the first in 15 years. The change in forecast is due to high commodity prices, a strong jobs market and a rise in net migration. A return to a $13.9bn deficit is expected in the following financial year. Another deficit of $36.9bn or 1.3% of Gross Domestic Product (GDP) is forecast for 2025-26 and then a decline to $28.5bn in the following year.

=== Revenues ===
The final budget outcomes for 2022–23 delivered a surplus of $22.1 billion (equivalent to 0.9% of Australia’s GDP), which was well above the government's forecasted surplus of $4.3 billion; this is Australia's first budget surplus in 15 years, and the largest ever Australian budget surplus.

== Expenditure ==
A$11.3 billion over the next four years is to be spent on aged care. Around 250,000 aged care workers will receive a 15% wage rise from 1 July 2023.

The Pharmaceutical Benefits Scheme undergoes a major change, with the cost of prescription drugs set to halve as dispensing rules were changed. It is estimated this will save $1.6bn for patients over the next four years.

$4bn was allocated to the Australian Defence Force's missiles to expand their long-range strike capabilities and to establish domestic manufacturing of guided weapons. The measure aims to modernise the force and make Australia self-reliant.

To stem a decline in new apprenticeships, the government will fund an overhaul of services and non-financial supports to apprentices.

The budget included an increase of $40 per fortnight in the JobSeeker allowance for most people, and $92.10 extra for long-term unemployed 55- to 60-year-old people.

A total of A$10.5 million has been allocated to improve mental health services for Indigenous Australians in the lead-up to the September/October 2023 referendum on the Indigenous Voice to Parliament: $500,000 for ANU's Mayi Kuwayu research team to monitor the well-being of communities, and the rest to the National Aboriginal Community Controlled Health Organisation.

== Opposition and crossbench response ==
Leader of the Opposition Peter Dutton withheld support for the JobSeeker increase in his budget reply speech, instead suggesting that welfare recipients should be allowed to earn more before their payments are reduced. He supported some of the proposed welfare and cost-of-living relief measures, but criticised the level of migration and Labor's stance against any form of nuclear power.

== Reception ==
The United Workers Union praised the decision to raise aged care workers pay.

== See also ==
- Economy of Australia
- Taxation in Australia
