= Obesity in Australia =

Share of adults that are obese, 1975 to 2016

According to 2007 statistics from the World Health Organization (WHO), Australia has the third-highest prevalence of overweight adults in the English-speaking world. Obesity in Australia is an "epidemic" with "increasing frequency." The Medical Journal of Australia found that obesity in Australia more than doubled in the two decades preceding 2003, and the unprecedented rise in obesity has been compared to the same health crisis in America. The rise in obesity has been attributed to poor eating habits in the country closely related to the availability of fast food since the 1970s, sedentary lifestyles and a decrease in the labour workforce.

== Classification of obesity ==
Classification	Body Mass Index (BMI)
Underweight	<18.50
Normal Range	18.50–24.99
Overweight	>25.00
Obese class 1	30–34.99
Obese class 2	35–39.99
Obese class 3	>40.00

Weight is measured by using the Body Mass Index scale (BMI). This is determined by dividing weight in kilograms by height in metres, squared. If someone is overweight their BMI will be at 25 or more. If someone is obese their BMI will be at 30 or more.

== Prevalence of obesity in the Australian population ==
As of 2022 it was estimated that 26% of children and 66% of adults were overweight or obese. Among adults, obesity was estimated at 32%, whilst "severe obesity" (BMI >35) was estimated at 13%.

=== Demographic summary ===
==== Queensland ====
City or region	% of population that is overweight or obese
Mackay	83.4%
Fitzroy	73.1%
Wide Bay-Burnett	70.1%
Townsville	64.6%
Toowoomba	63.3%
Brisbane	62.9%
Gold Coast	61.6%
Sunshine Coast	60.3%
Darling Downs	59.0%
Cairns	51.5%
Queensland	64.3%
Source: Yearbook 2017, Progress in Australian Regions, Australian Government, Department of Infrastructure, Regional Development, and Cities

=== Australian adults ===
In a study published in 2015 by the US Journal of Economics and Human Biology, obesity is found to have the largest impact on men aged over 75, and women aged between 60 and 74.

In 2005, a study was conducted by the Australian Bureau of Statistics that compared the results of a 2004-05 survey with those conducted in the preceding 15 years. The results showed an increase in the number and proportion of adults who are overweight or obese. Over the four surveys, the number of overweight or obese adults increased from 4.6 million in 1989–90 to 5.4 million in 1995, 6.6 million in 2001 and 7.4 million in 2004–05.

In 2007, the World Health Organization (WHO) found that 67.4% of Australian adults are overweight, ranking 21st in the world, and third out of the major countries in the English-speaking world, behind the United States (ranked 9th) and New Zealand (ranked 17th). A 2005 WHO study found that just over 20% of Australian adults are obese, that number increased to about 29 to 30% being obese in 2017.

In the 2005 National Health Survey, 53.6% of Australians reported being overweight with 18% falling into the "obese" category. Those numbers rose to 65% overweight and 29% obese in 2016. This is nearly double the reported number from 1995, when 30% of adults were overweight and 11% were obese. Such representations would be skewed downward as people tend to overestimate their height and under-report their weight, the two key criteria to determine a BMI reading. In the National Health Survey, obesity reports were fairly common across the board, with no major outliers. Victoria had the lowest incidence of obesity, at 17.0% of the population, with South Australia reporting the highest numbers at 19.6%. By 2014, Canberra recorded an obesity rate of 25% which was placing significant strain on ageing health care infrastructure.

In a study conducted by The Obesity Society, between 2001 and 2025, the adult population prevalence of normal healthy weight will decrease from 40.6% to 22.9%. In conjunction with this, the prevalence of obesity will increase from 20.5% to 33.9%. It is also estimated that by the time 25- to 29-year-olds of 2000 reach the age of 60–64 (2040), over one third will be obese.

A recent study reported that based on figures from the National Health Survey and/or Australian Health Survey the prevalence of overweight and obesity increased from 56.3% in 1995 to $61.2 in 2007–2008 and 62.8% in 2011–2012. This was attributed largely to an increase in the level of obesity from 18.7% to 27.5% over the period, with the proportion of overweight adults remaining similar (35.3–37.6%). The study argues for preventive health measures to be gender-specific and specific to socioeconomic disadvantage within populations.

Age-standardization of the 2011–12 Australian Health Survey was done in a recent study which reported 28.3% of Australian adults to be obese with 63.4% adults being overweight or obese. A subsequent analysis published in 2016 reported that despite obesity and overweight together being the second highest contributor to the burden of disease in Australia the regular screening and recording of measures of obesity and overweight in primary care setting especially within regional Australian catchments was much lower than optimal.

=== Indigenous population ===
Indigenous Australians have Australia's highest level of obesity. A 2001 study showing that 31% of Aboriginal Australians and Torres Strait Islanders were obese, nearly double the national average at that time.

The health and well being of Australian Indigenous youth is becoming increasingly concerning. A cross sectional study (Valery, Moloney, Cotterill, Harris, Sinha & Green, 2009) found that 46% of the total population, of participants, were overweight or obese. Of that population, 38% had enlarged waist circumferences, 43% had acanthosis nigricans present and 27% had hypertension. With this high population of overweight and obese Indigenous youth, it puts major implications on the public health system.

A University of Alberta study, conducted in 2006, noted that 60% of Aboriginal Australians over the age of 35 in Western Australia tested positive for diabetes. Health issues such as heart disease, obesity, and diabetes have lowered the life expectancy for Aboriginal Australians to 17 years below the national life expectancy, a gap that continues to grow.

Professor Paul Zimmet at Monash University, who conducted the aforementioned study of diabetes rates amongst Asian immigrants, released figures at the Diabetes in Indigenous People Forum in Melbourne, estimating the rate of diabetes from poor diet at 24% of all Torres Strait Islanders and remarked that unless extra steps are taken with these groups, Aboriginals and Torres Strait Islanders will die out within 100 years.

=== Immigrant populations ===
Individuals who migrate to Australia moving from a low income nation, have a greater tendency to undergo an increase in weight. A study done by Delavari et al. (2012) suggested that many immigrant groups showed signs of obesogenic lifestyle behaviours after migrating from low-HDI to high-HDI. It has also been found that Sudanese refugees in Australia have an increased risk of obesity compared to the general population. (Rezaho et al. 2014)

First-generation immigrants to Australia are more obese and have higher rates of obesity-related behaviours than white Australians or Australians of foreign ancestry whose families have been in the country at least two generations. A study conducted by the International Diabetes Institute at Monash University showed that Asians, Pacific Islanders, and Middle Eastern immigrants who moved to Australia were diagnosed with diabetes at a higher level than the average. The increase was explained by the adoption of a Western diet in place of a more healthy "traditional" diet more common in their native countries, as well as adopting a more sedentary lifestyle which is ubiquitous in developed countries.

=== Australian children ===
The percentage of overweight and obese children in Australia, despite rapid increases in the 1980s and the first half of the 1990s, have remained mostly steady for the past 10 years, with 23 to 24% of Australians under the age of 18 classified as overweight, and 5 to 6% of the same demographic classified as obese.

A study done by Nichols et al. (2011) found there has been a decreasing trend in overweight and obese preschool children, in Victoria, between 1999 and 2007. Among 2-year-old children, there was a decrease in the obesity of these children from 13.5% in 1999 to 12.4% in 2007 and in the 3.5-year-old children a substantial decrease from 18.5% in 1999 to 15.4% in 2007.

Increased media attention on childhood obesity, in 2007 and 2008 especially, caused many researchers to print findings that the rate of obesity for children has reached a plateau or that the claims are simply "exaggerated." The reports caused Dr. Rosanna Capolingua, President of the Australian Medical Association, to issue a statement admonishing people and media outlets for "trivialising" the issue.

A Western Australian study (Bell et al. 2011) showed that overweight and obese primary school children have greater medical complications due to their weight status. Overweight and obese children were more likely to complain and have depression, anxiety, bullying, headaches, enuresis and musculoskeletal pain. The most common site of the musculoskeletal pain was in the knees with overweight children 1.3 times and obese children 3 times more likely to complain about it than the control children. Overweight and obese children also had significantly higher levels of hypertension (control 3.4%, overweight 7.3%, obese 19%), impaired glucose tolerance (control: normal, overweight 1.3%, obese 5.3%) and hyperinsulinism (control 8%, overweight 19.5%, obese 38.9%).

The implementation of public health interventions in child care services has been recommended in Australia as a key strategy in the prevention of children becoming overweight or obese, especially in rural and remote areas of Australia. Quantifying the prevalence of obesity among children attending child care from non-metropolitan areas throughout Australia may be particularly important as the access to obesity prevention resources and professional development opportunities for child care service staff is limited. Financial constraints often experienced by smaller rural and remote child care services may limit their capacity to promote and encourage physical activity and health care to children participating in the child care services provided to them.

The study conducted by Wolfenden et al. found that approximately 17% of all children and 25% of indigenous children attending rural and regional child care services in the study area were overweight or obese. Such prevalence rates remain unacceptably high and confirm the need of prevention interventions targeting obesity in this setting.

For childhood obesity, the influence of broader parental and community contexts needs to be considered. Studies have found that young overweight boys spent significantly less time away from their parents than non-overweight boys, this potentially relates to the socio-economic status of the parents, as children residing from parents with a lower education level are at a higher risk of becoming overweight. It is possible that this is because young boys that spent a lot of their time with their parents were more likely to participate in sedentary activities, such as watching television or playing video games, than they were to participate in any kind of physical activity.

Jones et al. (2010) study found that early school years may be the time when child, parent and community characteristics begin to differ between overweight and non-overweight children, and may be an ideal time to target broader parental and community contexts influencing overweight and obese children.

A recent study conducted by The Swiss School of Public Health in 2014, found a clear association between the prevalence of obesity in low socio-economic standing school children within Australia. In 2006, it was found that children of low socio-economic standing were 2.22 times more likely to be obese compared to their high socio-economic standing counterparts. It was also discovered that these children of low socio-economic standing were 2.20 times more likely to be obese in 2012.

== Diabetes and cost of obesity ==
In May 2008, Diabetes Australia, the national body for diabetes awareness and prevention, told the House of Representatives that the cost of obesity on the country's health system in 2005 was an estimated A$25 billion (US$20 billion), In August 2008, Diabetes Australia's estimation more than doubled to $58 billion (US$46 billion), this time taking into account not just health care but job productivity and other related quality of living costs.

In 2003, the number of Australians with type 2 diabetes rose to nearly a million for the first time. In addition, the number of type 2 diabetes patients who were diagnosed solely on their weight was calculated at 242,000 in 2007, a 137% increase in cases in the previous three years.

In 2008 using the Body Mass Index scale, obese Australians (indirectly and directly) cost the nation $8.3 billion. Out of the $8.3 billion, $2.0 billion was the cost of the health system.

== Government response ==
In April 2008, the Australian Federal Government added obesity to its list of "national health priorities", officially elevating it to the same standard of attention given to other deadly ailments such as cancer, heart disease and diabetes. On 1 June 2009, the first Parliamentary comment on obesity in Australia was published, with the Standing Committee on Health and Ageing recommending 20 acts for the Federal Government to consider, including tax incentives to make healthier fruits and vegetables more affordable for Australians, and pressing the government to work with the food industry to lower fat and sugar levels in existing processed food. These recommendations covered a range of issues affecting obesity in Australia. The government agreed to the majority of the recommendations including to continue supporting the Active After-School communities program which lead more children to have more positive attitude towards physical activity and agreeing to develop consistent urban planning guidelines that focus on creating environments that encourage Australians to be healthy and active.

The former ALP government under Prime Minister Julia Gillard wanted to tackle the obesity problem in Australia by giving tax subsidies which would fund gym memberships to people who wish to lose weight. Her watchdog group, the National Preventative Health Taskforce, also wants to target childhood obesity by banning ads for junk food during the daytime when most children's television programs air.

In August 2008, the government of New South Wales announced that it would pay for morbidly obese patients to receive weight loss surgery, the first state to make such an announcement. Most Australians who wish to have such surgery have to go to a private hospital and pay for the procedure themselves, which costs $10,000 (US$10,000). A survey in Western Australia suggests that the number of patients who have undergone weight loss surgery has increased 20-fold in the past 20 years, with nine out of ten patients opting for the lap band procedure.

According to The Obesity Society Australia, if obesity rates continue to grow in Australia at this current rate over the next few decades, it is conceivable that the health and economic cost due to obesity will also grow to overwhelming portions.

== See also ==
- Australian paradox
- Cardiovascular disease in Australia
- Diabetes in Australia

General:

- Health in Australia
- Epidemiology of obesity
