= Baker Heart and Diabetes Institute =

Australian medical research institute

- Baker Institute logo
- Founders: John F. Mackeddie; Thomas and Alice Baker; Eleanor Shaw
- Established: 1926; 100 years ago
- Mission: Medical research
- Focus: Diabetes, heart disease, obesity
- Chair: Peter Scott
- Director: John P. Greenwood
- Faculty: Monash Partners: Alfred Health; Burnet Institute; Cabrini Health; Epworth HealthCare; Monash University; Prince Henry’s Institute; Monash Health
- Adjunct faculty: Alice Springs: Alice Springs Hospital; Aboriginal Medical Services Alliance Northern Territory; Tangentyere Council; Centralian Australian Aboriginal Congress; Northern Territory PHN
- Subsidiaries: Nirtek Pty Ltd; Osprem; V-Kardia Pty Ltd; Elacor Pty Ltd
- Formerly called: Baker Medical Research Institute; International Diabetes Institute; Baker IDI Heart and Diabetes Institute
- Location: 75 Commercial Road, Melbourne, Victoria, Australia
- Coordinates: 37°50′45″S 144°59′00″E
- Interactive map of Baker Heart and Diabetes Institute
- Website: baker.edu.au

The Baker Heart and Diabetes Institute, formerly known as the Baker Medical Research Institute, International Diabetes Institute, Baker IDI Heart and Diabetes Institute, and commonly known as the Baker Institute, is an Australian independent medical research institute headquartered in Melbourne, Victoria.

== History ==
Established in 1926, the institute is one of Australia's oldest medical research organisations with a historical focus on cardiovascular disease.

In 2008, it became the country's first medical research institute to target diabetes, heart disease, obesity and their complications at the basic, clinical, and population health levels.

The institute is located adjacent to The Alfred Hospital within the Alfred Research Alliance Precinct.

== History ==
The Baker Medical Research Institute was the creation of Dr. John F. Mackeddie, a clinical doctor and researcher, who had the idea of improving the laboratory facilities at The Alfred Hospital to keep up with advances in research. Mackeddie persuaded his friend, the photography industry pioneer and philanthropist Thomas Baker and his wife, Alice and sister-in-law, Eleanor Shaw, to assume financial responsibility. They decided the Institute should not only provide a better laboratory service for the hospital but should also have facilities for medical research.

In 1926, prior to appointing its first director, the Baker Institute hired Australian bacteriologist and biochemist Phyllis Ashworth as its first biochemist and electrocardiographer. Ashworth worked with the Institute's newly acquired Cambridge electrocardiograph, alongside her research into eclampsia.

Dr. William J. Penfold, who was internationally renowned in bacteriology and preventative medicine and was prominent in establishing the Australian Medical Research Council, was the first director of the Baker from 1926 until 1938. He was followed by Dr. Arthur B. Corkill, who first came to the Institute as a biochemist. Corkill described the methods of diagnosis and treatment of diabetes mellitus at The Alfred Hospital in 1927. Twenty years later, in 1947, a young biochemist called Joe Bornstein was introduced to Corkill. Their work together resulted in the discovery of the two forms of diabetes—insulin dependent diabetes mellitus (IDDM) and non-insulin dependent diabetes mellitus (NIDDM). This discovery in 1949 "... literally changed the concepts, research and treatment of diabetes".

From 1949 until 1974, Dr. Thomas E. Lowe was the institute's director. With a team of notable investigators, Lowe developed the Baker into a major research organisation with world-class facilities. The team included:

- Paul Fantl – identified key parts of the clotting cascade
- Alf Barnett – a pioneer of the treatment of hypertension and vascular disease
- Priscilla Kincaid-Smith – identified analgesics as a cause of kidney failure
- Winifred Nayler – helped define calcium channel physiology
- Austin Doyle – had a profound impact on hypertension research and founded the High Blood Pressure Research Council of Australia

It was during this time that cardiovascular research became the major focus. Research included the further development of cardiovascular surgery; new techniques of ECG and phonocardiography; treatment of congestive cardiac failure and of arterial hypertension. Sir James Officer Brown researched and tested open heart surgery in pre-clinical trials with the support of the Baker Institute, paving the way for Australia's first successful open heart operation at The Alfred Hospital in 1957 which was undertaken by Kenneth Morris. Morris went on to make major contributions to cardiac and thoracic surgery, alongside George Stirling (Director of the Cardiothoracic Surgery Unit at The Alfred Hospital from 1971 to 1988), with strong support from the Baker Institute in trialling and developing new cardiothoracic techniques.

Professor Paul Korner AO, a cardiac physiologist noted for his contributions to the understanding of hypertension, took on the role of director in 1975 and by this time, the sole focus of the institute was cardiovascular disease research. Significant advancements during this time included new strategies for hypertension; greater understanding of the role of the autonomic nervous system; insight into the role of cholesterol in atherogenesis and triglycerides as an independent risk factor for coronary atherosclerosis. Notable investigators included Paul Nestel (nutrition, CVD, atherosclerosis and lipid metabolism), Murray Esler (causes and treatment of high blood pressure and heart failure, and effects of stress on the cardiovascular system) and Garry Jennings (causes, prevention and treatment of CVD, and relationship between exercise, blood pressure, sympathetic nervous system activity and glucose metabolism).

Other notable investigators whose work would come to have a significant bearing on the Institute included Paul Zimmet, who pioneered Australia's first institute dedicated exclusively to diabetes. His research in Australian, Pacific, and Indian Ocean populations has highlighted the rise of diabetes worldwide, providing new insights into the genetic and environmental determinants of type 2 diabetes.

Professor John Funder AC was appointed Director in 1990 and bought his work on cardiovascular endocrinology, especially aldosterone action to the institute. Funder rewrote the pathophysiology of adrenal steroid action in the cardiovascular system, reshaping what we believe about aldosterone, cortisol and mineralcorticol receptors. He was recognised for his contributions to public policy across primary health issues.

In 2001, cardiologist-researcher Professor Garry Jennings AO became the institute's sixth director. Under Jennings' leadership, the Institute grew substantially and by 2002, the Institute had its own purpose-built facilities adjacent to The Alfred Hospital. By 2007, a national Aboriginal Health research program was established to help address the profound health disadvantage experienced by Aboriginal Australians and Torres Strait Islanders. Jennings also oversaw one of the most significant changes in the institute's history, the merger in 2008 of the Baker Heart Research Institute with the International Diabetes Institute, which was founded and led by Zimmet. This created Australia's first multidisciplinary medical research institute dedicated to the prevention and treatment of cardiovascular disease, diabetes, obesity and their complications, such as kidney disease.

In January 2016, Professor Thomas Marwick was appointed Director of the Institute. Professor Thomas Marwick FACC FESC FRCP FRACP had been Director of the Menzies Institute for Medical Research at the University of Tasmania and a Cardiologist at the Royal Hobart Hospital. He holds an MBBS from the University of Melbourne, a PhD from the University of Louvain and an MPH from Harvard School of Public Health. He has previously held the role of Head of the Cardiovascular Imaging, Heart and Vascular Institute and Imaging Institute at the Cleveland Clinic.

In May 2023, the Baker Institute appointed respected cardiovascular researcher and cardiologist Professor John Greenwood MBChB, PhD as their new Director. Professor Greenwood was the Director of the Cardiovascular Clinical Research Facility at Leeds Teaching Hospitals NHS Trust in the United Kingdom and President of the British Cardiovascular Society.

=== The Baker Heart Research Institute ===
J. F. Mackeddie, a pathologist originally from Scotland, but who practised in Melbourne in the early 20th century, became a close friend of Thomas Baker through being neighbours on land south of the city. Mackeddie was "concerned with the science of diseases and the need to apply the advancing knowledge of biological science to human illness…” After convincing Baker to donate funds, firstly to the Alfred Hospital and then for research, he went on to become one of the founding Trustees of the Baker Medical Research Institute. Mackeddie recruited A. B. (Basil) Corkill as a biochemist for the new Institute. The salary was paid by Thomas Baker.

The only consistent basic research in relation to diabetes and carbohydrate metabolism in the 20 years from 1925 was carried out at the Baker Institute in Melbourne.

— F. I. R. Martin

The initial project dealt with new techniques for diagnosing diseases of the nervous system, in particular, the changes in cell content and chemistry of cerebro-spinal fluid in various diseases. Other projects in the early days involved bacteriology, at the time the institute was started, the advancing edge of scientific medicine, and its application to the management of infectious disease in man. In the 1930s microbiology was a focus, with many of those projects reliant upon blood cultures and the techniques developed were published in a monograph – "Blood Cultures and their Significance" by H Butler in 1937. The Monograph Series lasted until 1974 – with 9 published. They covered anaesthesia, tumours, the cardiovascular system and scleroderma.

Basil Corkill described the methods of diagnosis and treatment of diabetes mellitus at the Alfred Hospital in 1927. Twenty years later, in 1947, Joe Bornstein a young biochemist was introduced to Basil Corkill, who by then was Director of the Baker Institute. Their work together resulted in the discovery of the 2 forms of diabetes – insulin dependent diabetes mellitus (IDDM) and non-insulin dependent diabetes mellitus (NIDDM). This discovery in 1949 “..literally changed the concepts, research and treatment of diabetes".

In the circumstances of the formation of the Institute it was to be expected that much of the research, at least in the earlier years, would be directed to the application of existing knowledge to the practical problems of clinical medicine.

— T. E. Lowe

In their collection of memoirs of Baker Medical Research Institute Alumni, Andrew and Barnett describe the work of the Baker Institute to have “..always been in the interface between scientific medicine and the practice of medicine, a field engendered and enhanced by its association with Alfred Hospital". They remark that from its earliest days, the staff were involved in communicating the outputs of research to the clinical community and the community in general. An example being the statewide tours of Victoria that Basil Corkill and Ewen Downe made to introduce the new insulin treatment of diabetes mellitus.

In 1940, Paul Fantl became interested in blood clotting. At the time, synthetic Vitamin K was being produced and was often in short supply. Using very simple equipment – test tubes, water bath, stop watches and a centrifuge – he was "in the forefront of a revolutionary concept that led to the recognition of Factors V, VII, and X", and with Miss Nance, internationally credited with the discovery of Factor V. He went on to become a member of the International Committee for the Standardisation of the Nomenclature of Blood Clotting Factors in 1956. In 1963 he was honoured when the Fantl-Koller Schema was declared.

Other areas of research up to 1949 included asthma, eye disease, immunoproteins, scleroderma and surgery. The research on surgery lead to the development of cardiac surgery at the Alfred Hospital.

In the 1950s Tom Lowe decided to make a study of congestive heart failure. He concluded "that the body's fluid system was an 'open system' with an intake and output and divisions of the contents under control of various factors". He was also interested in electrocardiography, especially vector cardiography and had machines constructed to show the three-dimensional view.

Between 1949 and 1974, staff at the Baker Medical Research Institute also devoted a significant amount of time and energy to equipment construction to meet the needs of their researchers, this included some early, crude versions of heart-lung machines to aid in cardiac surgery. Some research on the alimentary canal also was undertaken, however this work ceased in 1968.

In 1949, cardiovascular research was one of the major growth edges of medicine was cardiology. At the time, it represented two-thirds of the total research in the Baker Medical Research Institute. Cardiology research included:

- Further development of cardiovascular surgery
- New techniques of ECG and phonocardiography
- Introduction of cardiac catheterisation to record blood flow and pressure in circulation and introducing diagnostic materials
- Development of plethysmography to measure blood flow in limbs
- Clinical pharmacology of various cardioactive drugs
- Treatment of congestive cardiac failure and of arterial hypertension

=== The International Diabetes Institute (1984–2008) ===
The International Diabetes Institute was started in Melbourne in 1984 by Professor Paul Zimmet AO a number of years after his appointment to the Royal Southern Memorial Hospital.

"The research of Paul and his team in Pacific and Indian Ocean populations has provided new insights into the genetic contribution of NIDDM as well as the role of obesity, physical activity, nutrition and sociocultural change in the aetiology of this disorder".

In 1980 Zimmet was asked by the Council of the Australian Diabetes Society to prepare a submission, along with colleague Dr Ian Martin, titled 'Diabetes in Australia'. The submission was to the Federal Minister of Health. The submission highlighted the impact of diabetes in the community and what government needed to invest to find a cure or treatment and to support people with diabetes. At the same time, with Drv Matthew Cohen, Zimmet was the first to report their experience with home glucose monitoring and its acceptance in the diabetic population. They found better control, less hypoglycaemia and 95% acceptance.

One of the most significant contributions of the International Diabetes Institute has been the Australian Diabetes, Obesity and Lifestyle Study (AusDiab). In 2000 it was the first national study to provide estimates of the number of people with diabetes (based on blood tests) and its public health and societal impact. It is now considered an integral component of the National Diabetes Strategy to tackle the mounting problem of diabetes and its complications in Australia.

In addition to research, the IDI operated diabetes clinics in Melbourne from the site of the Caulfield Hospital. The diabetes clinics are the largest in Victoria, with more than 8000 patients per year and continue to be operated by Baker IDI from the organisation's site in Prahran in Melbourne's inner south-east.

=== Baker IDI Heart and Diabetes Institute (2008–2016) ===
In 2008 the Baker Heart Research Institute, as it was then known, merged with the International Diabetes Institute which had operated in Melbourne for over 25 years.

Baker IDI Heart and Diabetes Institute houses World Health Organization Collaborating Centres for Research & Training in Cardiovascular Disease and Diabetes (WHO Collaborating Centre for the Epidemiology of Diabetes Mellitus and Health Promotion for NCD Control).

=== Baker Heart and Diabetes Institute (2017–present) ===
In 2017 the Baker Institute streamlined their name and became the Baker Heart and Diabetes Institute.

== Research ==
The Baker Institute's work ranges from cellular and molecular biology research in the laboratory, to clinical-based research, through to lifestyle and behavioural research that aims to inform prevention strategies.

The institute organizes its Research Programs around broad scientific questions, with each program managed by senior scientists.

- Atherothrombosis: How can vulnerable plaque be identified and treated?
- Bioinformatics Discovery and Translation: Using big data approaches to inform our science.
- Cardiac Biology and Disease: How to reverse chronic heart disease, and prevent and repair structural damage to the heart from hypertension, heart disease and associated rhythm disturbances?
- Diabetic Complications: How to prevent the progression of diabetes to complications affecting arteries, the heart, the kidneys and the eyes?
- Inflammation and Immunometabolism: Maintaining overall health, no system in the human body is more important than our immune system
- Obesity and Lipids: Alterations in how we metabolise fats (lipids) underpins many chronic diseases including obesity, type 2 diabetes, cardiovascular disease and age-related dementia.
- Physical Activity: What physical activity, diet and other behavioural patterns are optimal at different life stages in preventing diabetes and cardiovascular disease, and how can behavioural and generational change best be addressed?

The Institute's domains provide the management structure for the Institute and bring researchers of kindred skills together.

- The Aboriginal Health Domain is a national program of research to improve the health of Aboriginal and Torres Strait Islander peoples, with a particular focus on the residents of Central Australia. This domain leads research projects in close collaboration with community stakeholders across remote, regional and urban settings.
- The Clinical Research domain provides a focal point for the institute's interests in human research and clinical-service provision, including governance and planning of clinical trials, clinical-service delivery through the Baker Specialist Clinics, and an increasing interest in diagnostic imaging – including MRI, cardiac echo and ultrasound.
- The Discovery and Preclinical Domain aims to identify new avenues for the design of diagnostic, preventative and therapeutic strategies to tackle cardiovascular disease, diabetes and its complications.
- The Population Health Domainis examining the trends in diabetes and obesity prevalence and incidence, novel risk factors at a population level, and new therapeutic approaches to preventing and treating diabetes, heart disease and obesity.
- The Systems Biology Domain encompasses the Institute’s laboratories that are focused on human research, especially those linked with computational biology. These researchers are focused on improving the diagnosis and therapy for patients with heart failure, coronary artery disease, vascular disease, atherosclerosis, metabolic disease and those who have suffered a heart attack.

=== Research outcomes and achievements ===
- Baker scientists have developed a one-hour mitral valve (the heart's largest valve) repair device. It is implanted in a one-hour day surgery procedure that previously required open-heart surgery. Baker Institute scientist, Dr David Kaye, and his team have invented a device that fixes a leaking valve in the heart. The mitral valve controls the blood flow from the lungs back into the left side of the heart, to be pumped back out through the rest of the body. This valve often leaks in patients with heart failure, so-called mitral regurgitation. When the heart enlarges, which is a characteristic feature of heart failure, the left ventricle enlarges and makes this valve function abnormally. Blood goes back into the lungs and that in fact is one of the causes of the symptoms of breathlessness and waking up in the night short of breath. It contributes to heart failure being a progressive disease, one in which the heart continually gets worse. The device is placed in the heart using a catheter-based system. A thin metal wire made of a special medical-grade alloy tightens up this valve, putting a little ring around it from the outside, which improves the function of the mitral valve and reduces regurgitation.
- The institute is the coordinating centre for the Australian National Blood Pressure trial.
- Baker scientists have performed research underpinning international guidelines for the treatment of cardiovascular diseases, including the first studies demonstrating that regular exercise reduces blood pressure and improves insulin sensitivity.
- Baker Institute scientists published the first study showing the benefits of walking.
- The Baker Institute has also published widely in nutrition, dietary supplements, and metabolism based research.
- The Baker Institute has shown that some anti-diabetes drugs (ACE inhibitors) also have an anti-ageing effect.
- Baker Institute research proved that mental stress and cigarette smoking both provide selective and potentially harmful stimulation of the nerves of the heart.
- The Baker Institute demonstrated that exercise can lower blood pressure. The study was a collaboration between the Baker Heart and Diabetes Institute, and the University of Melbourne and University of Queensland.
- Baker Institute scientists have proved for the first time that damage done by unhealthy eating is "remembered" in genetic controls – epigenetics – and turns off good genes needed to prevent diabetes, heart disease and other complications. Lead researcher Assoc Prof Assam El-Osta, from the Baker Heart and Diabetes Institute team, said this meant that eating a chocolate would not only go straight to your hips, but also sit on your DNA.
- A world-first test to identify people who will suffer heart disease years before they die of a heart attack is being developed by the Baker Institute. The test has the potential to screen for heart disease long before any symptoms strike by pinpointing patterns in proteins contained in urine, which were discovered by researchers at Baker Heart and Diabetes Institute. There are no tests to screen for atherosclerotic cardiovascular disease – which is responsible for 80 per cent of heart conditions – and the first sign of illness for many people is a fatal or near-fatal heart attack. The Melbourne team led by Prof Karlheinz Peter developed a urine test with the German biotech company Mosaiques and the University of Freiburg, which has already proved 84 per cent accurate in early trials.
- Described an assay for glutamic acid decarboxylase to discriminate major types of diabetes mellitus
- The plasma protein which led to the distinction between type 1 diabetes and type 2 diabetes was discovered by Baker Institute scientists
- Sir James Officer Brown researched and tested open heart surgery on animals with the support of the Baker Medical Research Institute, and went on to supervise the first successful open-heart surgery in Australia in 1957. Other Baker Institute colleagues such as Kenneth N Morris and George Stirling performed the first coronary bypass and the first heart transplant whilst associated with the institute.

== Structure and organisation ==
=== Locations ===
Research, education to the public, health professionals, biomedical research students and patient care are located within the Alfred Medical Research and Education Precinct in Melbourne and Adelaide and the Baker IDI Centre for Indigenous Vascular and Diabetes Research in Alice Springs. International projects in heart disease and diabetes are currently conducted in Mauritius, South Africa, Fiji, India, and Vietnam.

=== Funding ===
The Baker Heart Research Institute is funded from a diverse range of government and private sources including the corporate sector, trusts and foundations and individual donors. Financial supporters from the pharmaceutical industry since 2016 include Abbott Laboratories, Amgen, AstraZeneca, Bayer, Boehringer Ingelheim, Eli Lilly and Company, GlaxoSmithKline, Merck & Co., Novo Nordisk, Pfizer and Sanofi. The United States government has also provided funding through the Centers for Disease Control and Prevention and National Institutes of Health.

In 2007 the Baker IDI Concise Financial Report showed receipts from granting bodies of $32.6 million. A further $7.4 million came from donations and bequests and $20.27 million from commercial income.

=== Collaborative partners ===
The institute was a founding partner of the Alfred Medical Research and Education Precinct in 2002, which also includes Alfred Health, Monash University, Burnet Institute, La Trobe University and Deakin University.

The Baker Institute is also a partner of Monash Partners Academic Health Science Centre, an Australian health industry, research and educational collaboration. In March 2015, Monash Partners was recognised by the National Health and Medical Research Council as one of four Advanced Health Research and Translation Centres in Australia.

Baker Institute's longest partnership has been with The Alfred Hospital, which dates back to the institute's inception in 1926 on the hospital site. One of the significant developments of this partnership has been the Alfred Baker Medical Unit, which was established in 1949 and is the hub of joint research and clinical activity between the two institutions.

=== Subsidiaries ===
- Osprey
- V-Kardia Pty Ltd
- Elacor Pty Ltd

== See also ==
- Health in Australia
- Cardiovascular disease in Australia
- Diabetes in Australia
