= Health in New Zealand =

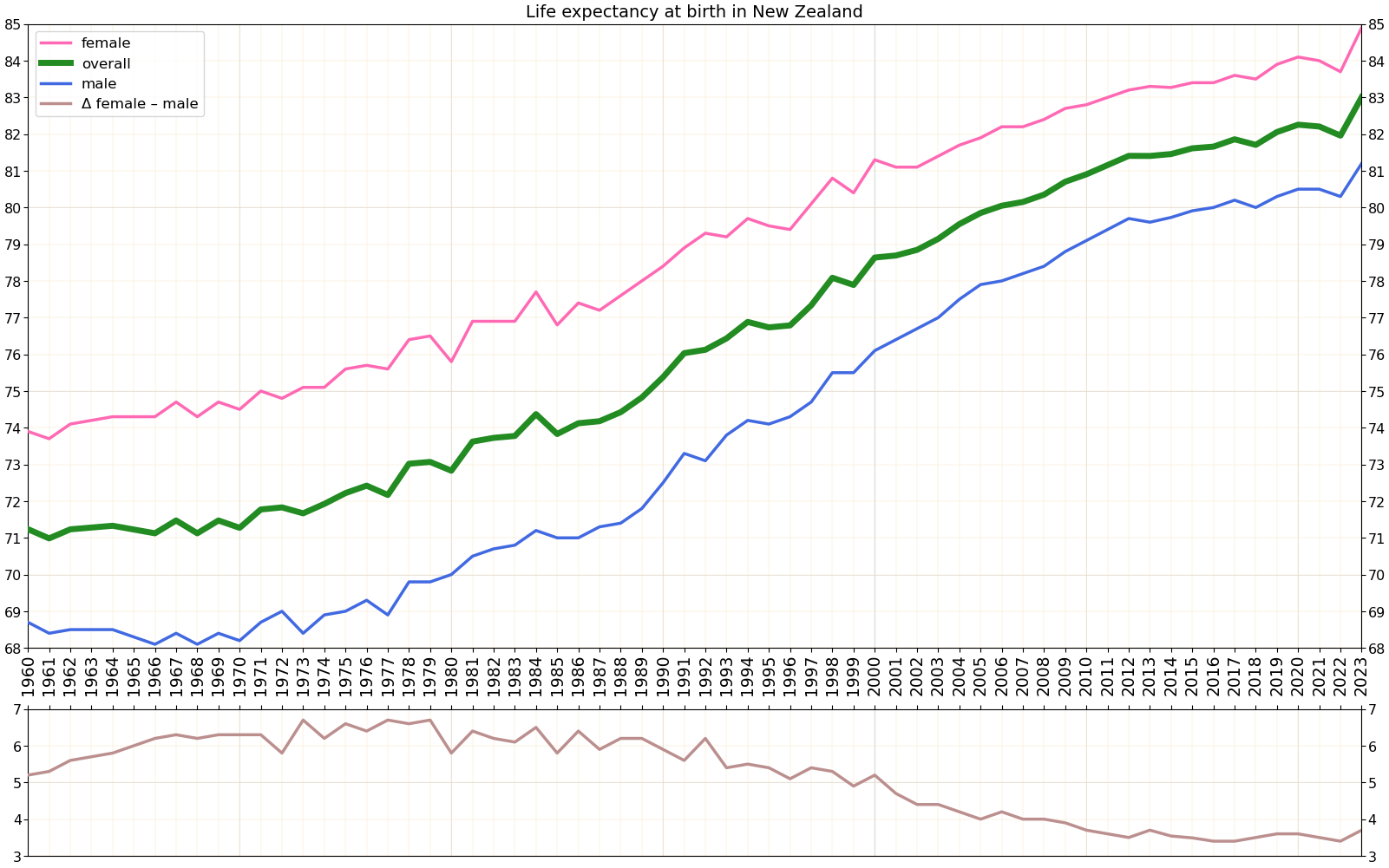
Life expectancy development by gender

New Zealand is a high income country, and this is reflected in the overall good health status of the population. However like other wealthy countries, New Zealand suffers from high rates of obesity and heart disease.

The Human Rights Measurement Initiative finds that New Zealand is doing 92.3% of what should be possible at its level of income for the right to health.

== History ==
Māori life expectancy was about 30 years in the 18th century, similar to that of Western Europe. After Europeans brought new diseases, and loss of land impoverished many Māori, the childhood mortality rate was very high and Māori life expectancy dropped to 25 years for men and 23 years for women by the end of the 19th century.

Pre-contact Māori viewed disease as a punishment for breaking tribal tapu but also recognised that some families were prone to certain disease. The standard practice of tohunga was to isolate the victim in a small shelter. The most common serious disease was tuberculosis (kohi). However, Māori did not recognise the symptoms as being from one disease. Kohi was considered the work of demons and caused by makutu (witchcraft).

== Public health programs ==
There are public health campaigns for obesity, drinking, smoking and various vaccines.

== Health care ==
The health care system has undergone significant changes throughout the past several decades. From an essentially fully public system based on the Social Security Act 1938, reforms have introduced market and health insurance elements primarily since the 1980s, creating a mixed public-private system for delivering healthcare. In 2012, New Zealand spent 8.7% of GDP on health care, or US$3,929 per capita. Of that, approximately 77% was government expenditure. In a 2010 study, New Zealand was shown to have the lowest level of medication use in 14 developed countries (i.e. used least medicines overall), and also spent the lowest amount on healthcare amongst the same list of countries, with US$2510 ($3460) per capita, compared to the United States at US$7290.

== Mental health ==
Mental health in New Zealand generally follows the trends of mental health in other OECD countries. New Zealand's outdoor life style and high standard of living are balanced by isolation and a self-reliant culture, which discourages asking for help. Historically, people with mental health problems were institutionalised, whereas now the focus is on care in the wider community. The stigma around poor mental health has been lessened in recent years as a result of this change and public education campaigns. However, New Zealand's Māori people, other minorities, and youth continue to be over-represented in the negative mental health statistics.

== Health statistics ==
Obesity rates as a percentages of total population in OECD member countries in the years 1996–2003. New Zealand is 7th, with 20.9% of the adult population having a body mass index of greater than 30.

The following statistics are a sample from the World Health Organization Statistical Information System. The year on which the data were sampled follows the statistic in brackets.

- Demographics
  - Population (in thousands): 4,460 (2012)
  - Total fertility rate (per woman): 2.07 (2012)
  - Adolescent fertility rate (%): 27 (2004)
- Funding
  - Per capita government spending (PPP Int $): 1,905 (2006)
  - Per capita total spending (PPP Int $): 2,447 (2006)
  - Total expenditure (% of GDP): 9.4 (2006)
- Life expectancy
  - Life expectancy at birth (years): 82 (2012)
  - Life expectancy for females (years): 84 (2012)
  - Life expectancy for males (years): 80 (2012)
  - Neonatal mortality (per 1,000 live births): 3 (2012)
  - Infant mortality (per 1,000 live births): 5 (2012)
  - Years of life lost to communicable diseases (%): 5 (2002)
  - Years of life lost to injuries (%): 17 (2002)
  - Years of life lost to non-communicable diseases (%): 79 (2002)

Life expectancy is lower for the Māori and Pacific populations by around six years.

== See also ==
- COVID-19 pandemic in New Zealand
- Health in Australia
- HIV/AIDS in New Zealand
- Living Streets Aotearoa
- Road toll (Australia and New Zealand)
