= Cardiovascular disease in Australia =

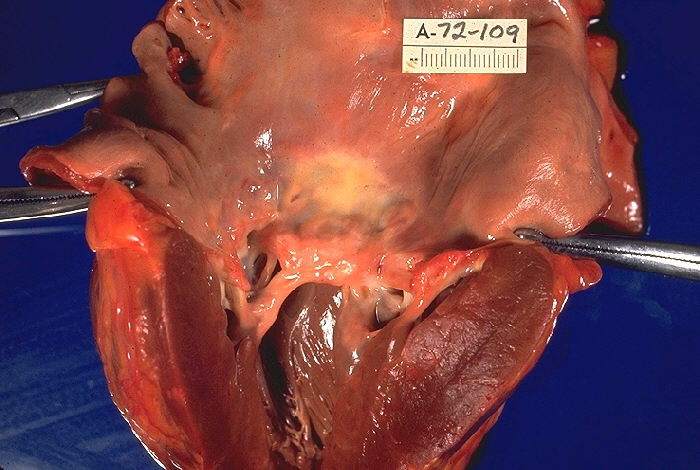
The human heart

Cardiovascular disease, including heart disease, is a major cause of death in Australia. Heart disease is an overall term used for any type of Cardiovascular disease that affects the heart reducing blood supply to the heart. It is also often referred as Cardiac disease and Coronary heart disease. It is generally a lifelong condition where damage to the artery and blood vessel cannot be cured.

Cardiovascular disease (CVD) continues to have a major impact on the health of Australians in terms of prevalence, mortality, morbidity, burden of disease and expenditure. From 2007 to 2008, an estimated 3.4 million Australians were diagnosed with CVD. Cardiovascular disease remains Australia's leading cause of death. In 2009, 46,106 deaths in Australia were directly linked with CVD (21,935 males and 24,171 females); this figure represents a total of 33% of all deaths in Australia. It was reported in 2010 that almost 16% of the total projected burden of disease was a result of CVD. This then made individuals with CVD susceptible to co-morbid conditions later in life, making them "at risk" for depression and anxiety.

== Types of heart disease ==
There are number of conditions that involves the heart such as:

- Heart failure – damaged heart muscles, therefore, it becomes too weak to pump blood to the body (Newton & Joyce, 2012, p. 74).
- Coronary heart disease – when plaques deposits in the coronary artery narrowing the artery reducing the flow of blood to the heart muscle (Newton & Joyce, 2012, p. 75)
- Stroke – blocked blood vessel in the brain resulting in the brain tissues not receive oxygen (Newton & Joyce, 2012, p. 76)
- Myocardial infarction (heart attack) – blockage in the arteries that completely blocks the blood flow to the heart (Newton & Joyce, 2012, p. 76)
- Peripheral vascular disease – the flow of blood supply is slow or absent in veins and arteries in the limbs (Newton & Joyce, 2012, p. 72)

== Risk factors ==
=== Smoking ===
This is a major risk factor of heart disease resulting in death. The rate of smoking is low in Australia according to the health survey: 14% of women and 18% of men being daily smokers (Nichols, 2014).

==== Physical inactivity ====
58% of Australians lack physical activity. Those who undertake low levels of physical activity are at higher risk of developing heart disease. Men were classified as moderately active than women (Nichols & Peterson, 2014).

==== Excessive alcohol consumption ====
Alcohol plays a huge role in Australian culture and its social circumstance. According to the Australian Bureau of statistics, 87.6% of males and 77.3% of females had consumed alcohol in the past year. Higher levels of alcohol consumption, including binge drinking (more than about four drinks at a time) and heavy alcohol use (more than 7 drinks per week for women, or 14 drinks per week for men) is associated with higher levels of heart disease. Whether drinking low or moderate amounts of red wine (and no other types of alcohol) reduces the risk of heart disease is debated.

==== Overweight ====
Being overweight and obese is very common in Australia especially children and teens. Almost 69.7% of male and 55.7% of female are overweight. The rate for both men and women of obesity is 27.5% (Australian Bureau of statistics). It is one of the leading cause of heart disease and cardiovascular disease.

==== High blood pressure ====
High blood pressure (hypertension) causes stress to the heart and its function that leads to heart disease. Males experience heart disease caused by hypertension than women. One in five Australians with high blood pressure has heart disease (Nichols, 2014).

== Epidemiology ==
Heart disease is the leading cause of death in Australia. In 2007-8 about 3.5 million people were diagnosed with heart disease (especially cardiovascular disease). Although there are significant advances in the treatments, heart disease still remains the lead cause of death in Australia especially with people in lower socioeconomic groups (AIHW, 2011).

The number and rate of deaths from CVD have fallen considerably from the peak levels experienced in the late 1960s and early 1970s when CVD was responsible for around 60,000 deaths annually, or roughly 55% of all deaths each year. These major gains have been attributed to a combination of research, improvements in prevention and detection of cardiovascular disease, and better clinical management of people with the disease. There is a close interrelationship between CVD and other important chronic conditions, including diabetes and chronic kidney disease.

Cardiovascular disease kills one Australian every 11 minutes, and 3·4 million of the country's population are affected, with the Indigenous Australians having a 30% higher rate. In their lifetime, 1·5 million Australians are estimated to have diabetes and one in six Australians are suspected to have a stroke. The Baker Heart and Diabetes Institute, based in Melbourne, is one of the most well known cardiovascular disease research institutes.

One of the studies directed by an Australian-Dutch research team, led by, Karin Jandeleit-Dahm from Harald Schmidt from Maastricht University, Netherlands, has identified the role of an enzyme which accelerates the development of diabetic atherosclerosis. Researchers were able to substantially reduce the development of artery plaques by suppressing or inhibiting this enzyme with a new drug, which will allow prevention and treatment of cardiovascular disease in people with diabetes.

Another team, led by Bronwyn Kingwell, Head of the Baker Institute's Metabolic and Vascular Physiology, have found a new use for an old drug. The researchers found that after taking the standard anti-hypertensive drug Ramipril, patients with peripheral arterial disease (PAD), which restricts mobility due to leg pain, enjoyed a longer and less painful time on their feet. For some patients, this could be the difference between living independently and living under the care of others for the rest of their lives.

== Rural, remote and Indigenous cardiovascular disease ==
Cardiovascular disease disproportionately affects Aboriginal and Torres Strait Islander Australians and those living in rural and remote areas. In 2022 to 2023, an estimated 39,300 First Nations adults representing 6.5% of the population were living with heart, stroke or vascular disease, with First Nations people aged 25 and over experiencing an estimated 2,700 acute coronary events in 2023. Aboriginal Australians are approximately twice as likely to experience a heart attack as non-Indigenous Australians and face significantly higher mortality from coronary heart disease. Cardiovascular disease accounted for approximately 23% of all Indigenous deaths between 2015 and 2019. Rural and remote Australians face compounded cardiovascular risk due to higher rates of modifiable risk factors including smoking, diabetes, and obesity, alongside reduced access to preventive healthcare and specialist cardiac services. Regional hospitals with cardiac catheterisation facilities play a critical role in delivering timely interventional cardiology to rural populations, reducing treatment delays for conditions such as ST-elevation myocardial infarction where transfer to metropolitan centres would significantly worsen outcomes.

== See also ==
- Diabetes in Australia
- Health in Australia
- Baker Heart and Diabetes Institute

== Bibliography ==
- AIHW. (2011). Cardiovascular disease: Australia facts. Canberra: AIHW Retrieved from http://www.aihw.gov.au
- Chenzbraun, A. (2010). Heart disease. Oxford University Press Retrieved from http://www.eblib.com
- Newton, J, T. & Joyce, A, P. (2012). Human perspectives 2AB (6th Ed). Australia & New Zealand: E. Gregory.
- Wood, J., & Gordon, P. (2011). Preventing heart disease in women: The NP's role. The Nurse Practitioner. doi: 10.1097/01.NPR.0000410275.21998.b5
