= Baker Institute =

Baker Institute may refer to:

- James A. Baker III Institute for Public Policy, a think tank on the campus of Rice University in Houston, Texas, US
- Baker Heart and Diabetes Institute, an Australian research institute headquartered in Melbourne, Australia
