= Health in Australia =

Australia is a high-income country, and this is reflected in the good status of health of the population overall.

In 2025, Australia ranked 7th on the United Nations Development Programme's Human Development Index, indicating the level of development of a country.

== Disparities ==
Despite the overall good status of health, large disparities exist between the health of different demographics within Australia. The poor and those living in remote areas as well as Indigenous Australians are, in general, less healthy than others in the population, and programs have been implemented to decrease this gap, under the government initiative Closing the Gap. These include increased outreach to the Indigenous communities and government subsidies to provide services for people in remote or rural areas.

== Life expectancy ==
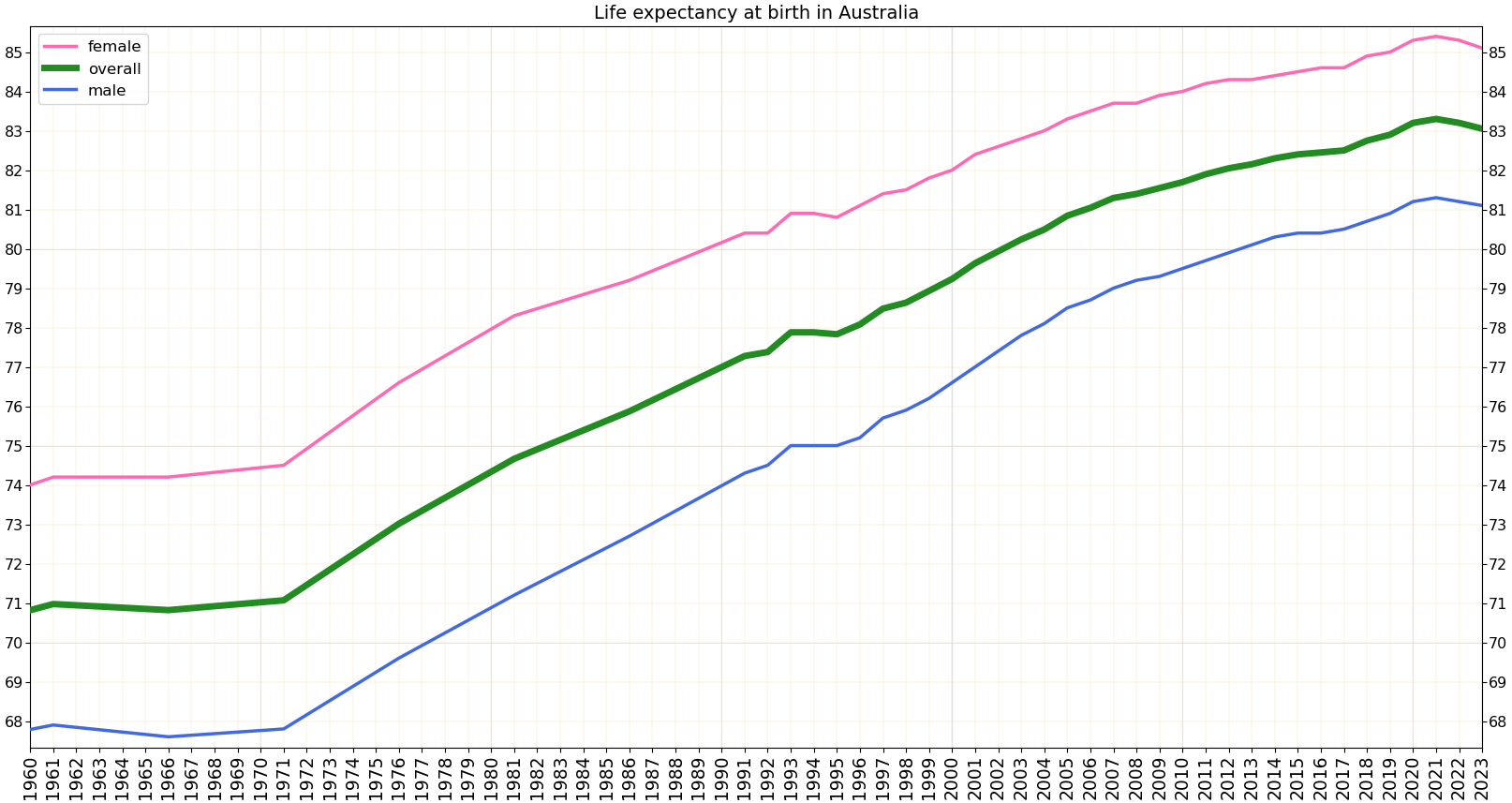
Life expectancy at birth in Australia

Life expectancy in Australia is among the highest in the world. According to the 2013 Global Burden of Disease Study Australia was ranked third highest in life expectancy. The life expectancy (at birth) in 2015 was estimated to be 79.7 years for males and 84.74 years for females. In 2018 the average number of years a newborn Australian child would live if current mortality patterns were to stay the same was 82.9 years, this has increased from 69.3 years since 1950. In 2015, the crude birth rate was 13.3 per 1,000 people, while the total fertility rate in 2018 was 1.83. The crude death rate in 2018 was 6.7 per 1,000 people. The infant mortality rate was 3 per 1,000 live births. In 2002/2004, less than 2.5% of the population was undernourished.

Life Expectancy in Australia is above the global average of 72 years as of 2016.

== Under-5 mortality rate (U5MR) ==
Since 1950, Australia's U5MR has dropped from 31.6 deaths per 1000 live births to 8.85 deaths in 1990 to 3.4 currently in 2018. The global U5MR was 93 deaths in 1990 and was recorded at 40.8 in 2016.

== Disability adjusted life years ==
The top ranked causes of disability-adjusted life years (DALYs) lost for Australian citizens as of 2016 for all ages and sexes were:

- neoplasms – 3,751 DALYs per 100,000 population
- mental disorders – 3,216 DALYs per 100,000
- musculoskeletal disorders – 2,956 DALYs per 100,000
- cardiovascular diseases – 2,895 DALYs per 100,000

Since 2013 Australia's total DALYs has been slightly increasing each year.

== Causes of death ==
The leading causes of death in Australia in 2011 were ischaemic heart disease, cerebrovascular disease, dementia and alzheimer disease, trachea, bronchus and lung cancers and chronic obstructive pulmonary disease. More than half of all consultations with GPs in Australia are in relation to chronic condition such as heart disease, cancer or diabetes.

As of 2012 the fastest-growing chronic illness in Australia was diabetes. There are approximately 100,000 new diagnoses every year. On average one Australian is diagnosed with type 2 diabetes every five minutes.

There was an 80% increase in cyclist deaths on Australian roads between 2017 and 2018. 45 people died.

The leading causes of death according to the Institute for Health Metrics and Evaluation (IHME) as of 2016 in Australia were: 1st Cardiovascular Disease (accounting for 219.03 deaths per 100,000 population), 2nd Neoplasms (accounting for 201.65 deaths per 100,000 population), 3rd Neurological Disorders (accounting for 76.18 deaths per 100,000 population). In the Western Pacific Region in which Australia lies within, the leading causes of death are 1st Cardiovascular Disease (Accounting for 274.55 deaths per 100,000 population), 2nd Neoplasms (accounting for 172.8 deaths per 100,000 population) and 3rd Chronic Respiratory Disease (59.25 deaths per 100,000 population).

== Women's health ==
In 2011, endometriosis was estimated to affect 550,000 women and girls in Australia, with estimated direct costs of $6 billion per annum for medical and surgical treatments of adult women and $600 million per annum for medical and surgical treatments of girls. Between the ages of 15 and 49 years, approximately 1 in 10 women are affected by it, a higher incidence than conditions such as breast cancer, prostate cancer, diabetes and AIDS combined within that age range. Working women are estimated to lose 11 hours per week due to absenteeism and presenteeism. In addition, there are the indirect costs and the general loss of quality of life due to the debilitating pain. Such indirect costs include welfare payments for disability and unemployment, expenditure on complementary medication and therapies, and the medical costs of treating consequential issues of mental health and infertility caused by endometriosis. Endometriosis usually first presents symptoms during adolescence but there is an average of 8 years from first symptoms to diagnosis, due to parents and general practitioners "discrediting" the pelvic pain as being a "normal" aspect of the menstrual cycle, while employed women encounter negativity by employers towards women perceived to have menstrual irregularities.

In July 2018, Australian Health Minister Greg Hunt launched a National Action Plan for Endometriosis, which calls for:

- increased education and awareness about endometriosis among sufferers, health professionals and the public
- improved access to diagnostic and treatment services using evidence-based clinical guidelines and an accreditation system for clinicians
- further research into the causes, diagnosis and treatment of endometriosis

== Health status ==
According to the Australian Institute of Health and Welfare, "The health status of a country incorporates a number of different measures to indicate the overall level of health. It is more than merely the presence or absence of disease; it includes measures of physical illness, levels of functioning and mental wellbeing."

A 2007 study found that the 11 largest preventable contributions to the Indigenous burden of disease in Australia were tobacco, alcohol, illicit drugs, high body mass, inadequate physical activity, low intake of fruit and vegetables, high blood pressure, high cholesterol, unsafe sex, child sexual abuse and intimate partner violence. The 26% of Indigenous Australians living in remote areas experience 40% of the health gap of Indigenous Australians overall.

== Preventable diseases ==
Cigarette smoking is the largest preventable cause of death and disease in Australia but the proportion of the population who smoke, 16%, is amongst the lowest in the world. It was 34% in 1983. See Category:Smoking in Australia.

Chronic non-communicable diseases account for a higher proportion of deaths than infectious diseases in Australia. Australia has the fifth highest rate of obesity in the OECD. More than a third of the adult population are overweight and about a third obese. 57% do not take enough exercise.

Australian health statistics show that chronic disease such as heart disease, particularly strokes which reflects a more affluent lifestyle is a common cause of death. Australians, the majority of whom are fair-skinned, are prone to skin cancer because of exposure to UV light from sunlight with 80% of all cancers diagnosed being of the skin, unlike in Canada or US where skin cancer is 2-3 times less common because of less intense sunlight.

Other issues include compensation for victims of asbestos exposure related disease, lead exposure due to inhalation of lead based paints and the slow development of HealthConnect. The provision of adequate mental health services and the quality of aged care, are other problems in some parts of the country.

== Vaccination ==
In Australia, vaccinations are available for vaccine-preventable diseases. This is part of the National Immunisation Program Schedule.

In an effort to boost vaccination rates in Australia, the Australian Government ruled that starting on 1 January 2016, certain benefits (such as the universal Family Allowance welfare payments for parents of children) would no longer be available for conscientious objectors of vaccination; those with medical grounds for not vaccinating would continue to receive such benefits. The policy is supported by a majority of Australian parents as well as the Australian Medical Association (AMA) and Early Childhood Australia.

In 2014, about 97 percent of children under 7 years were vaccinated, though the number of conscientious objectors to vaccination increased by 24,000 to 39,000 over the decade to 2015.

The government began the Immunise Australia Program to increase national immunisation rates. They fund a number of different vaccinations for certain groups of people. The intent is to encourage the most at-risk populations to get vaccinated. The government maintains an immunisation schedule.

== Notifiable diseases, epidemics, and pandemics ==
The Australian Centre for Disease Control runs the National Notifiable Diseases Surveillance System (NNDSS), which compiles information on over 70 diseases that pose a threat to public health in Australia. The NNDSS produces the National Notifiable Disease List (NNDL), which lists the diseases that are required to be notified under Australian legislation.

The COVID-19 pandemic in Australia occurred from around March 2020. By 6 August 2022, Australia had reported over 11,350,000 cases and 19,265 deaths. The government declared the emergency response "finished" in September 2022 and removed all restrictions. On 20 October 2023, the Australian Chief Medical Officer declared that COVID-19 was no longer a Communicable Disease Incident of National Significance and ended all national emergency response and coordination, shifting COVID-19 management to a more general infectious disease framework.

Endemic measles was declared eradicated from Australia in February 2009, and Australia has maintained its World Health Organization (WHO)-certified measles elimination status since 2014. Around this time, the government schedule changed the second dose of MMR vaccine from the age of four years to 18 months, with the aim of increasing uptake. Measles remains a notifiable disease, which is required to be reported to the NNDSS. The NNDSS portal shows statistics on measles since 1991, showing that the high of 4,794 cases in 1994 dropped to 10 by 2005. It has varied since then, but rose to 181 in 2025. In August 2026, the National Centre for Immunisation Research and Surveillance raised concerns that the population was becoming vulnerable to outbreaks, after a study that looked at 2019 statistics estimated 1.7 million Australians, or 6.7% of the population, did not have sufficient immunity in that year. Experts are concerned about the possibility of measles, along with other diseases previously eradicated from Australia, such as diphtheria, returning to the population owing to factors such as decreasing rates of vaccination owing to misinformation spread since the COVID-19 pandemic, and the combination of busyness and complacency among parents.

In July 2022 two cases of diphtheria occurred in northern New South Wales. In May 2026, an outbreak occurred in the Northern Territory of Australia, with 133 cases reported to the NNDSS, including one death. The outbreak spread into Aboriginal land across the state border in South Australia, as well as Western Australia and Queensland. By October 2026, the outbreak had increased to more than 600 cases across the country. SA Health delivered over 4,500 vaccines in the APY Lands in the far north and south-west of the state, where most cases had occurred (22 by October). The federal government provided support to affected jurisdictions. The outbreak is the biggest since national records began in 1991; the baseline over three years for Australia was 35 cases a year, which had declined to 24 in 2025. Australia stands second to Nigeria in 2026.

== Health impacts of climate change ==
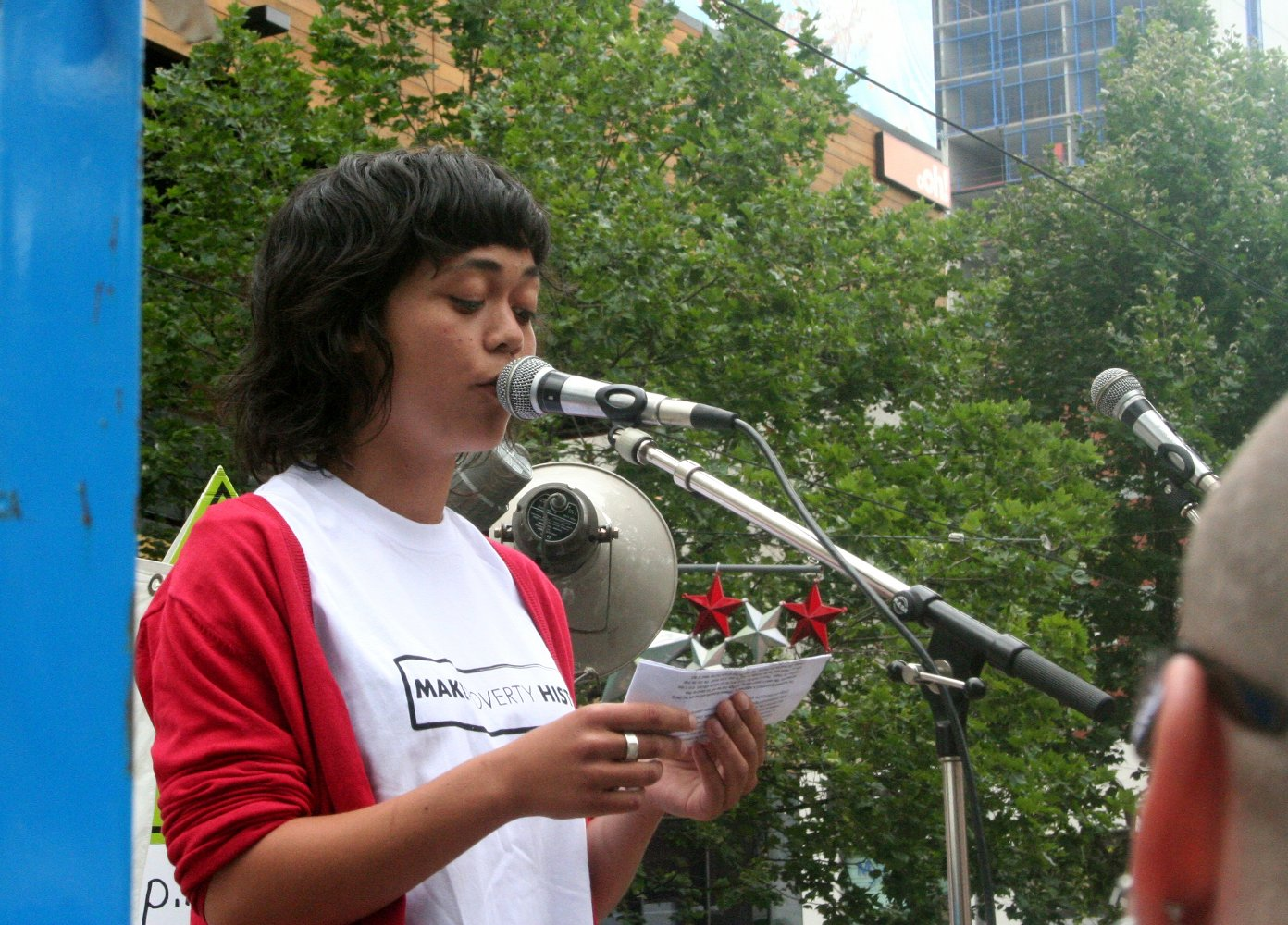
Refugees from Pacific Islands such as Tuvalu are projected to increase.

The CSIRO predicts that the additional results in Australia of a temperature rise of between only 1 and 2 °C will be:

- Southward spread of malaria receptive zones.
- Risk of dengue fever among Australians increases from 170,000 people to 0.75–1.6 million.
- 10% increase in diarrhoeal diseases among Aboriginal children in central Australia.
- 100% increase in a number of people exposed to flooding in Australia.
- Increased influx of refugees from the Pacific Islands.

Based on some predictions for 2070, data suggests that people who are not accustomed to the warmer climate may experience as much as 45 days per year where they are unable to tolerate being outside, compared to the current 4–6 days per year.

== Initiatives ==
=== Services and studies ===
- Healthdirect Australia – a government-funded service that provides access to health information, and listings of health services
- National Disability Insurance Scheme, a nationwide scheme supporting people with disabilities and their carers
- Women's Healthy Ageing Project – the longest ongoing study of women's health in Australia (est. 1990)

=== Drug and alcohol abuse ===
The National Alcohol Strategy (2006–2011) was superseded by the National Drug Strategy 2017–2026, under which is included the sub-strategies National Alcohol Strategy 2019-2028; National Fetal Alcohol Spectrum Disorder (FASD) Strategic Action Plan 2018–2028; National Ice Action Strategy 2015; and National Tobacco Strategy 2023–2030.

=== Cancer prevention ===
- Cancer Council Australia, a national, nonprofit organisation which aims to promote cancer-control policies and to reduce the illness caused by cancer
- Slip-Slop-Slap, a slogan used in the skin cancer prevention campaign in the 1980s
- SunSmart, a skin cancer prevention campaign

=== General health ===
- Life. Be in it., a health promotion and advertising charity, primarily known for its campaign encouraging people to be more active, started by the Victorian Government in 1975 and spread nationally; relaunched in 2023
- "Go For Your Life", another Victorian health promotion campaign to promote fitness and healthy eating, launched in 2004 and hailed as "the biggest health awareness campaign in 20 years" (since Life. Be in It.)

=== Others ===
- The National Diabetes Services Scheme (NDSS) is administered by Diabetes Australia on behalf of the Commonwealth Government.

== Table ==
Australia's Human Development Index and component indicators for 2015 relative to selected countries and groups
	HDI value	HDI rank	Life expectancy at birth	Expected years of schooling	Mean years of schooling	GNI per capita (PPP USD)
Australia	0.939	2	82.5	20.4	13.2	42,822
Canada	0.920	10	82.2	16.3	13.1	42,582
New Zealand	0.915	13	82.0	19.2	12.5	32,870
OECD	0.887	-	80.3	15.9	11.9	37,916
Very high HDI	0.892	-	79.4	16.4	12.2	39,605

== See also ==
- Child nutrition in Australia
- Concussions in Australian sport
- Cosmetic surgery in Australia
- Health care in Australia
- HIV/AIDS in Australia
- Immigrant health in Australia
- Obesity in Australia
- Suicide in Australia
