= Skin cancer in Australia =

Skin cancer prevalence by country in 2008. Australia and New Zealand have the highest rates of skin cancer, shown in red.

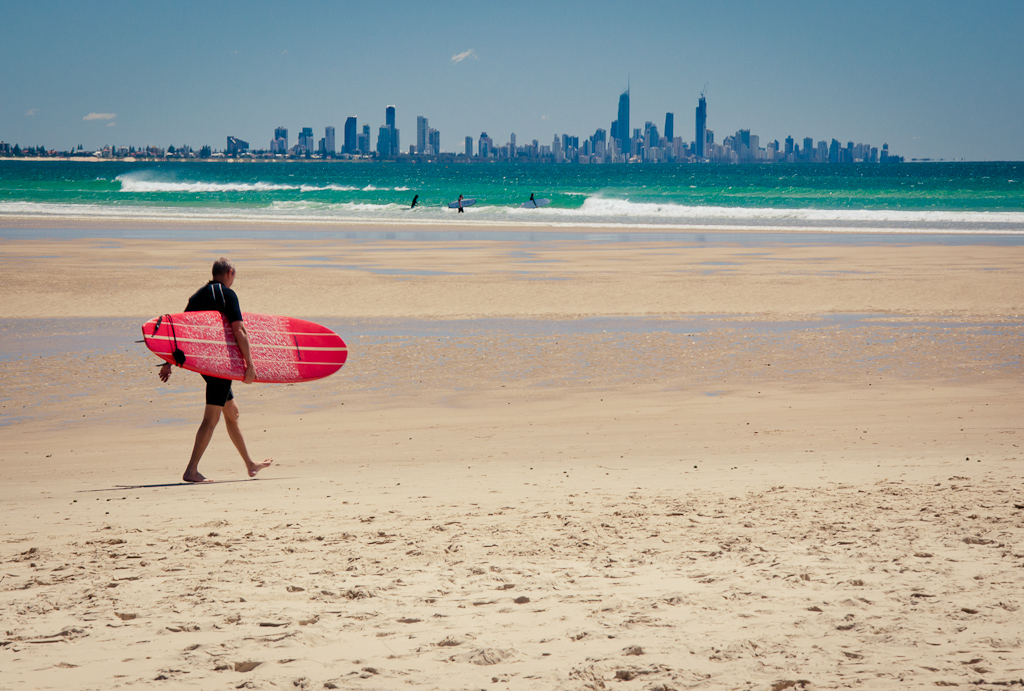
Currumbin Beach, Queensland, Australia

Skin cancer in Australia kills over 2,000 people each year, with more than 750,000 diagnosed and treated. Australia, followed by New Zealand, have the highest skin cancer rates worldwide. This is attributed to Australia having a high percentage of people with fair skin, while being relatively close to the equator, with higher intensity ultra-violet radiation (UVR), the primary cause of skin cancer. These demographics are a result of migration of Europeans with lighter skin over relatively recent periods in history.

Approximately 2 out of 3 Australians will be diagnosed with some form of skin cancer during their lifetime. However, non-melanoma keratinocyte skin cancer is the most common cancer diagnosed in Australia, with 1 million treatments per year.

Australia experienced relative success through skin cancer prevention campaigns such as SunSmart, started in the 1980s, and continued to invest and promote awareness through government-funded mass media strategies. Although Australia has one of the highest national rates of skin cancer, mortality trends in melanoma were stable as of 2002.

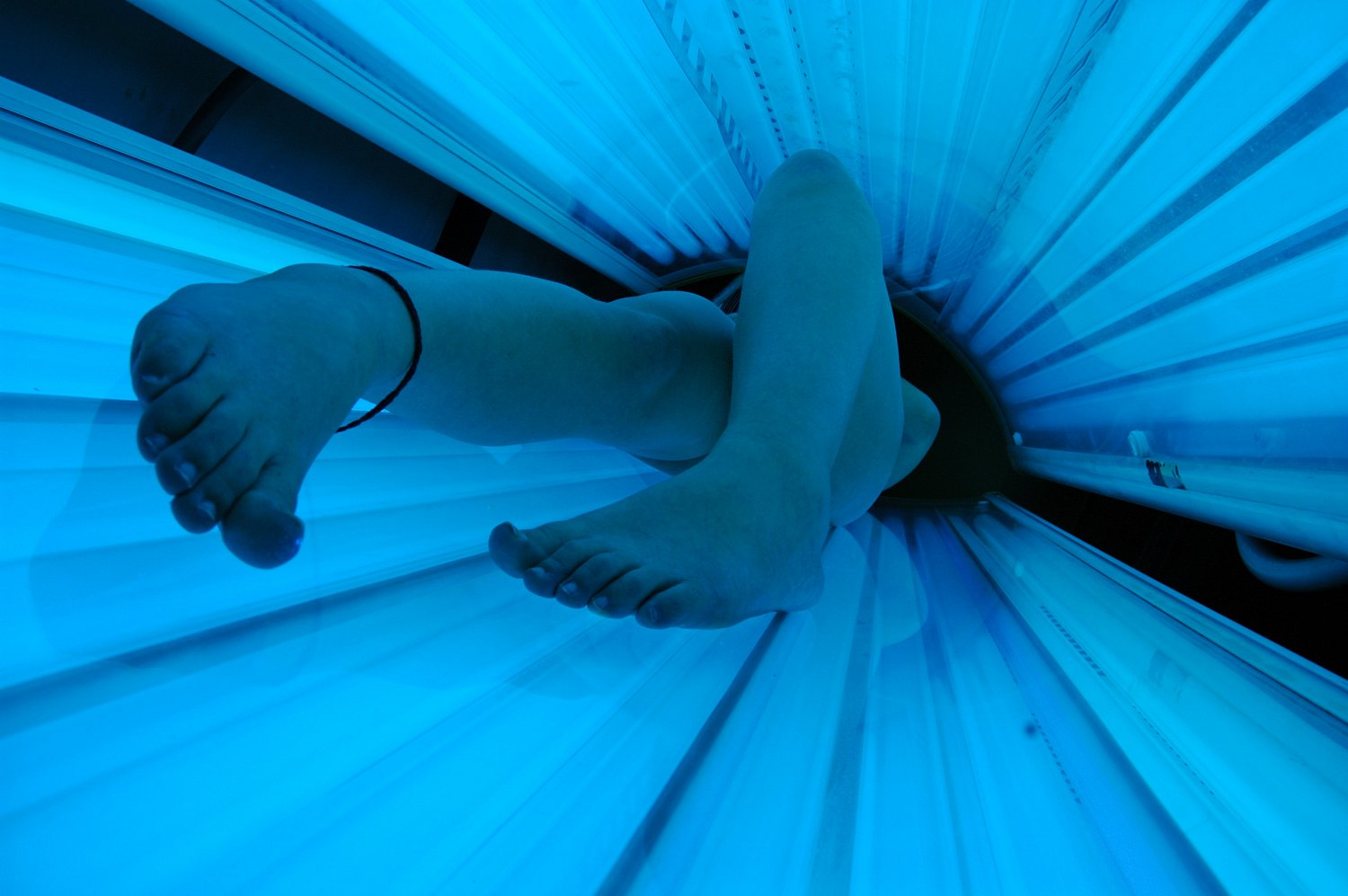
sun bed tanning

Sun tanning is also a major part of Australian culture and contributes to skin cancer rates. This has led to government bans on commercial indoor tanning beds in every state in Australia effective January 2016.

== Awareness ==
Australia, followed by New Zealand, have the highest skin cancer rates worldwide. Factors include the large percentage of the population with fair skin prone to skin cancers and the high levels of ambient UV radiation. Similarly the Anglo-Celtic ancestry of many New Zealanders together with their outdoor lifestyle, is presumed to be a dominant factor in the risk, due to the effect of high UV levels on fair skin.

The UV Index (UVI), defined as the sun-burning strength of ultraviolet rays (UVR), in Canada ranges between 1 and 10.

The National Institute of Water and Atmospheric (NIWA) research recorded that New Zealand (similar latitude to Australia) the UVI exposure often exceeds 13 and is 40% more than that recorded at comparable latitudes in North America.

In order to maintain effective prevention and national awareness Australia used a variety of campaigns and initiatives beginning in the early 1980s.

The Slip, Slop, Slap campaign was initiated in 1981 introduced a seagull singing a catchy jingle “Slip on a shirt! Slop on some sunscreen! and Slap on a hat!”, promoted awareness and entered Australian culture. It was so successful that it remained part of the SunSmart slogan, which was updated to read, Slip, Slop, Slap, Slide (on sun glasses), Seek (shaded areas). SunSmart began in 1987, led by an Australian foundation focused on promoting skin cancer awareness. Social education, challenging societal and cultural ideals, is one of SunSmart's methods for promoting awareness and through its many successes now functions throughout all of Australia, under state Cancer Councils.

The first government-funded mass media skin cancer initiative began in Australia during 2006. Its skin cancer awareness message was delivered through radio, television and printed mediums.

Media promotion and education is a part of Australian skin cancer awareness strategy. However, some members of the public remain unaware of the risks caused by insufficient sun protection and skin care.

== Mortality ==
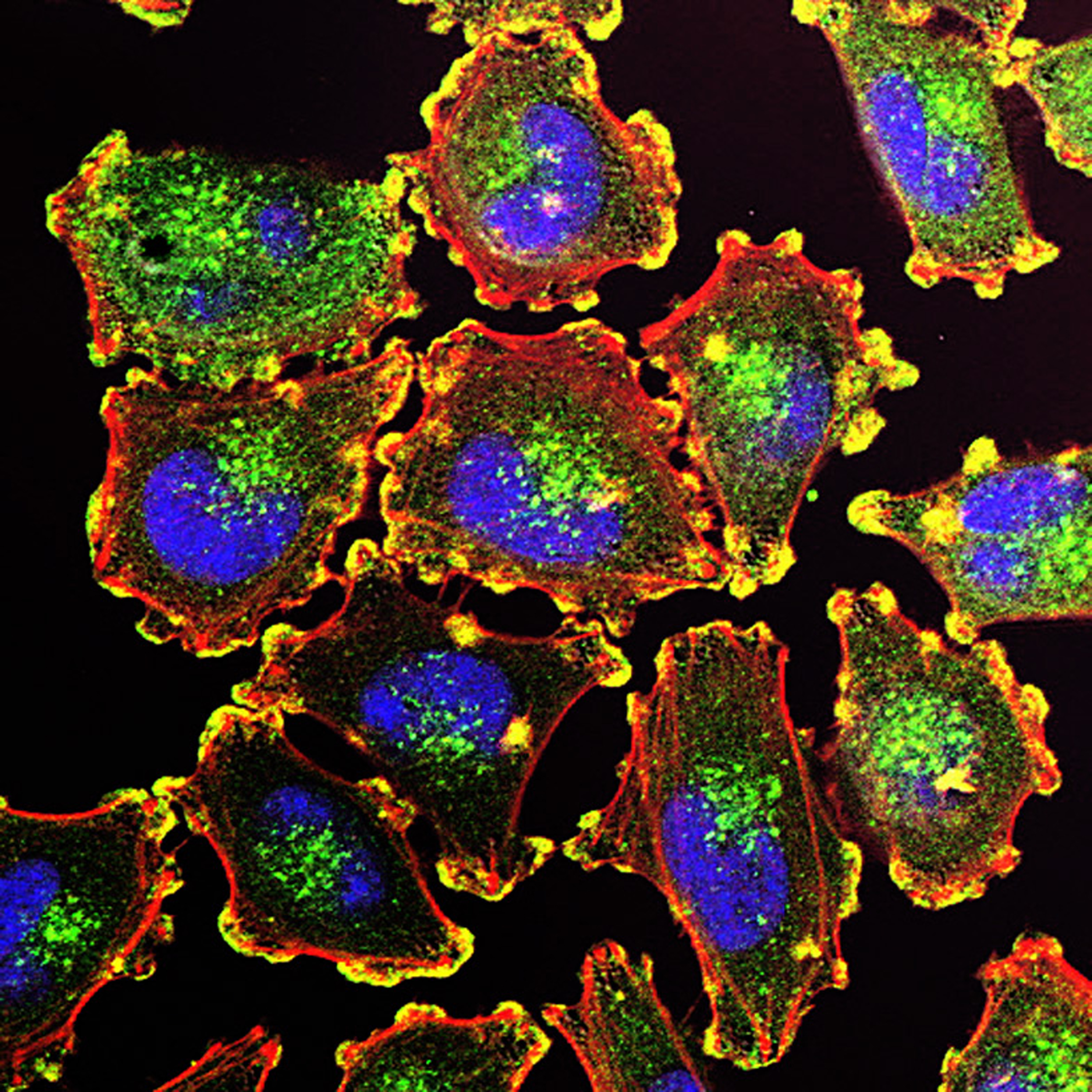
Metastatic melanoma cells

Skin cancer has three main forms: basal-cell carcinoma, squamous-cell carcinoma (both of which are non-melanoma cancers; the former is less likely to spread and result in death) and melanoma. The first two are the most prevalent forms. Although generally non-melanoma carcinomas have lower associations with mortality than melanomas, fatalities occur, with 534 reported deaths in 2011. 434,000 Australians in 2008 underwent treatment for non-melanoma carcinomas. Melanomas have the highest correlation with mortality, killing 1,544 in 2011.

Australia, followed by New Zealand, have the highest skin cancer rates worldwide. In 2011, New Zealand surpassed the Australian rate for invasive melanoma cases and now has the highest melanoma incidence in the world.

=== Trends in melanoma mortality ===
Australia has recorded increased mortality rates of melanoma from the 1950s, continuing to rise until the late 1980s and beginning to steadily decline from 1990 onwards. Australia has some of the world's highest melanoma-related fatalities—double the mortality rates of south and central Europe. The introduction of preventive campaigns correlate with the transition to decreases in melanoma mortality. Sun protection, other forms of primary protection, early detection and increased public awareness have had the greatest impact.

== Prevention ==
Awareness and early detection are the most efficient tools for avoiding skin cancer and are the basis of many effective prevention campaigns in Australia. Prevention initiatives such as SunSmart promote awareness by advocating effective sun protective methods, sun risk awareness and are an integral part of skin cancer prevention. SunSmart recommends wearing protective clothing, hats, sunscreen, seeking shade from the sun and wearing UV protective eyeware. SunSmart also provides recommendations on how to choose the right protective products. Regular skin checks are another important preventive step.

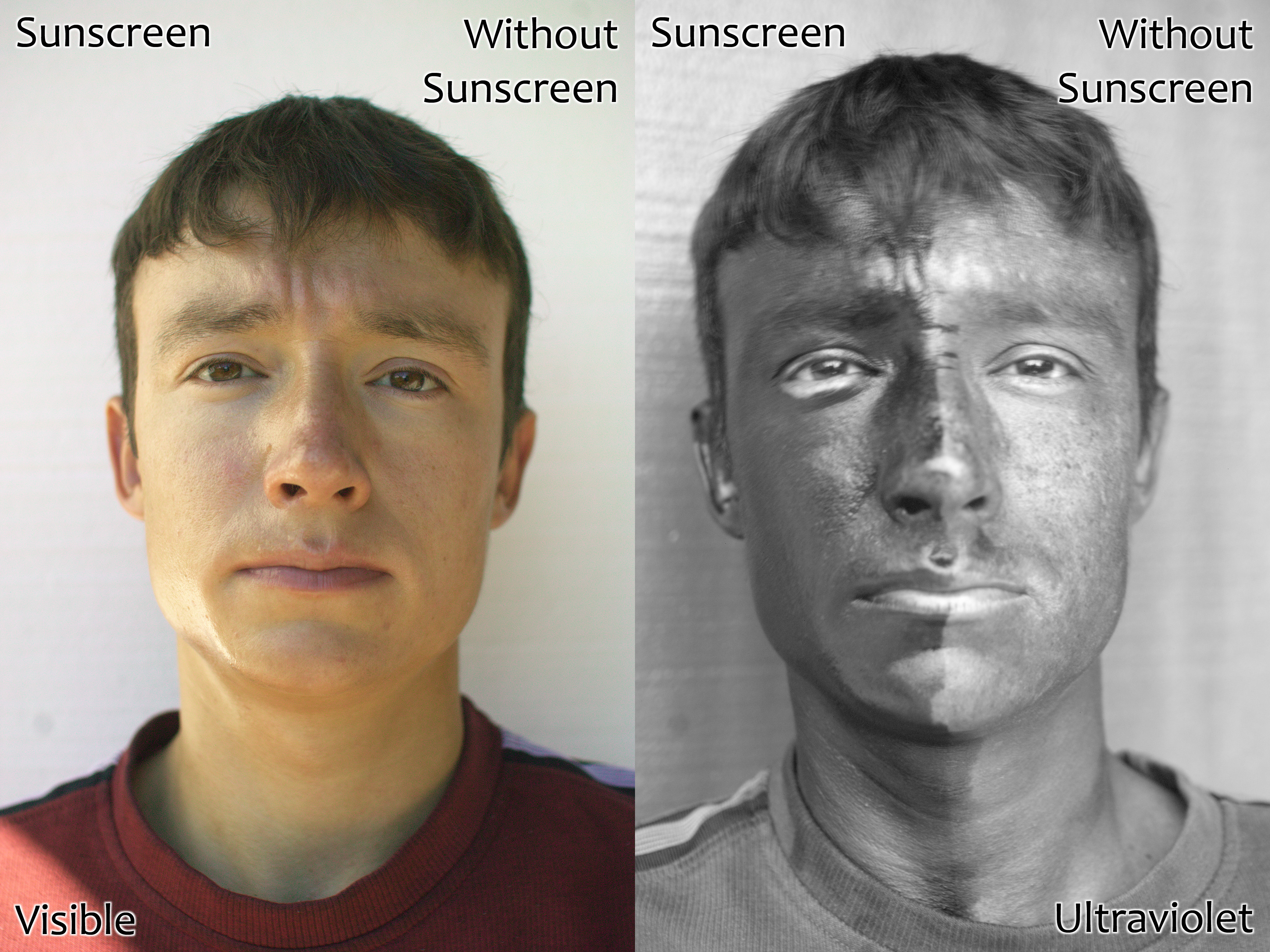

The standard for skin cancer screening in Australia is self-assessment and occasional clinic screening.

Consistent with Australian guidelines for public skin cancer screening, Cancer Council Australia does not recommend annual or regular skin assessment because low national melanoma occurrences do not financially justify national public screening. A 2003 study analysing the effectiveness of skin cancer screening was implemented in northern Germany. Study doctors received 8 hours of training and over a year screened 19% of Schleswig-Holstein’s population. Initially melanoma detection increased 34%. After 5 years the population experienced over 50% decrease in melanoma mortality.

=== Economic implications of prevention campaigns ===
Australia spends more than $2 billion annually treating cancer, with skin cancer the most costly. From 2005 to 2015, over $300 million was spent annually on diagnosis, treatment and pathology-related costs of skin cancer. With $512.3 million spent in 2010 on melanoma carcinomas, costs continued to rise.

The number of life-years lost and loss of productivity both have a bearing on the financial cost of the disease. The direct and indirect expenses of skin cancer in the Australian state of New South Wales (NSW) have been investigated. Direct costs included those resources related to skin cancer management, and indirect costs were concerned with premature mortality and morbidity. Review of 150 000 skin cancer patients in NSW (2010) revealed a total lifetime cost estimation of AU$536 million, with 72% of this cost related to direct costs, and the remaining 28% to indirect costs; the direct costs were higher in females and indirect costs higher in males. Prevention initiatives make up an important part of financial expenditure for skin cancer funding and investments. Prevention programs are a productive tool, as they beneficially influence attitudes and behaviours towards skin cancer, but also deliver positive financial returns. A 2009 study analysed the economic impact of prevention programs such as SunSmart. SunSmart demonstrated positive health impacts, was cost effective. The Victoria-based program returned $3.60 for every $1 invested. It concluded that SunSmart prevented 103,000 skin cancers and more than 1,000 related fatalities from 1988-2003. The study found strong evidence that continued investment and support for SunSmart was economically sound and presented beneficial outcomes for Australia.

== See also ==
- Cancer Council Australia
- Health in Australia
