= SunSmart =

Australian non-profit organisation

- Purpose: Skin cancer prevention, healthy sun habits
- Location: Australia
- Website: www.sunsmart.com.au

SunSmart is a not-for-profit health promotion program in Australia that promotes a balance between the benefits and harms of sunlight exposure, most notably including vitamin D and skin cancer.

Cancer Council Victoria and the Victorian Health Promotion Foundation (VicHealth) first funded SunSmart in 1988 in Victoria. Programs now operate in each state and territory of Australia by respective Cancer Councils, all using common principles but tailored to jurisdictional priorities.

Since the iconic Slip! Slop! Slap! message of the 1980s, the SunSmart program has expanded the sun protection message to include Seek shade and Slide on sunglasses.

Australia has one of the highest rates of skin cancer in the world. At least two in three Australians will be diagnosed with skin cancer by the age of 70 and more than 1,800 Australians die from skin cancer each year.

SunSmart's investment in prevention brings considerable human and economic benefits across Australia. The program has generated a $2.30 net saving for every dollar spent, and was rated the second most cost-effective and health-saving intervention by the Victorian Department of Treasury.

The 2010 Assessing Cost-Effectiveness of Prevention report identified an intensive SunSmart campaign as one of a handful of cost-effective interventions for the future that would have a large impact on Australia's health.

== See also ==
- Skin cancer in Australia
