= Australian paradox =

Obesity-related trend in Australia

The Australian paradox is an observation of diverging trends in sugar consumption and obesity rates in Australia. The term was first used in a 2011 study published in Nutrients by Jennie Brand-Miller and Alan Barclay, which reported that in Australia, "a substantial decline in refined sugars intake occurred over the same timeframe that obesity has increased."

The "paradox" in its name refers to the fact that sugar consumption is often considered (for example by Robert Lustig) to be a significant contributor to rising obesity rates, and because ecological studies in the United States have found a positive relationship over certain time periods between sugar consumption and obesity prevalence, although added sugar consumption is also now declining in the United States.

== Reaction ==
Some people have criticized Brand-Miller's 2011 study, such as economist Rory Robertson, who argued that "[Brand-Miller's study's] regular claim – "In Australia sugar consumption has dropped 23 per cent since 1980" – is woefully misleading, based as it is on a series that was abandoned by the Australian Bureau of Statistics (ABS) as unreliable a decade ago." Robertson has also argued that while the paper claims that consumption of sugary soft drinks in Australia declined by 10% between 1994 and 2006, it actually increased by 30%. He cites these and other data to support calling the research "a menace to public health".

In February 2014, the Australian Broadcasting Corporation (ABC) aired a program criticizing the 2011 study proposing the existence of the paradox, based in part on Robertson's research. The CEO of the Australian Beverages Council, Geoff Parker, has responded that his industry cites other studies besides Brand-Miller's 2011 study to support their view that sugar is not uniquely linked to obesity. In response to Robertson's allegations, Sydney University, Brand-Miller's employer, launched an investigation to determine if she is guilty of research misconduct. A spokesperson for the university said there were "...no substantiated claims against the work of any academic at the university, nor indeed has there been any finding that the complaints warrant any further investigation".

In July 2014, Brand-Miller and Barclay were cleared of misconduct by a six-month investigation conducted by Robert Clark of the University of New South Wales. Following an investigation prompted by the Australian economist, two minor arithmetical errors were identified in the original manuscript of The Australian Paradox, which were promptly corrected. This was the only allegation out of 8 others that was substantiated.

Another study on the same topic was published in 2013 by researchers (Rikkers et al.) from the University of Western Australia. The study concluded that "The Australian Paradox assertion is based on incomplete data, as it excludes sugar contained in imported processed foods, which have increased markedly." The study argued that the claim that sugar consumption had been declining in Australia relied only on production data, and that Australia gets back much of the raw sugar it exports in the form of processed foods. Tom McNeill argued that Rikkers et al.'s paper was significantly flawed, writing: "Rikkers et al.'s biggest source of error is the inclusion of incorrect products in the category of "moderate to high sugar content", in violation of their study inclusion criteria. Fruit juices and fruit drinks have been added to the analysis by the authors without consideration of their actual sugar content, or the very definition of these products which must be adhered to by food manufacturers under the control of Food Standards Australia and New Zealand (FSANZ)". A narrative review of eye disease published the following year argued that the claim of the existence of an Australian paradox "is flawed as it assumes declining sugar intake, without taking into account imported foods containing sugar", quoting Rikkers et al.'s analysis as evidence.

Brand-Miller and Barclay have responded that Rikkers et al. are wrong and that, in fact, the sugar consumption data they used (compiled by the United Nations Food and Agriculture Organization, the Australian Bureau of Statistics and Australian beverage industry) "all incorporated data on imported products". Recent research by Levy and Shrapnel ("Quenching Australia's thirst: A trend analysis of water-based beverage sales from 1997 to 2011") has concluded that added sugar from soft drinks has continued to decline.

Brand-Miller's stated that per capita sales of sugar-sweetened beverages had decreased by 10%, in an interview with ABC Radio in 2014, "it might be that a key word came out. It's possible that this should be, 'While nutritively sweetened beverages ... 10 per cent sweetened beverages decreased by 10 per cent.' So I'll double-check it." Barclay, the 2011 study's other author, also said, in an email to the program, that "the 10 per cent decline could not possibly refer to per capita sales of nutritively sweetened soft drinks". As mentioned previously, Brand-Miller and Barclay published a correction to their original 2011 study addressing this. According to Esther Han, this correction invalidates the study's claim that soft drink consumption decreased from 1994 to 2006.

Complaints about the scientific journal Nutrients over its publication of The Australian Paradox paper led to the Open Access Scholarly Publishers Association (OASPA) investigating Nutrients publisher, MDPI. In 2014, OASPA's investigation concluded that MDPI continued to meet its membership criteria.

In April 2017, an update of all available Australian added sugars consumption data titled "Declining consumption of added sugars and sugar-sweetened beverages in Australia: a challenge for obesity prevention" was published in the American Journal of Clinical Nutrition. The analysis concluded "In Australia, 4 independent data sets confirmed shorter- and longer-term declines in the availability and intake of added sugars, including those contributed by SSBs (Sugar Sweetened Beverages)."

Independent analyses by Australian researchers including Ridoutt and colleagues at the Commonwealth Scientific and Industrial Research Organisation (CSIRO) and Lei and colleagues also concluded that Australians consumed less added sugars in the years 2011–12 than they did in 1995.

In December 2017, the Australian Bureau of Statistics published a comparison of free sugars consumption using Australia's 1995 National Nutrition Survey and 2011/12 Australian Health Survey titled "CONSUMPTION OF ADDED SUGARS – A COMPARISON OF 1995 TO 2011–12". Its main conclusion was "Between 1995 and 2011–12, Australians had a relative decrease in their consumption of free sugars, with the average proportion of dietary energy from free sugars declining from 12.5% to 10.9%." For reference, the World Health Organization has strongly recommended that adults and children reduce daily intake of free sugars to less than 10% of their total energy intake, and that an intake level below 5% or 25 grams would provide additional health benefits.

== See also ==
- French paradox
