= Murray Esler =

Australian cardiologist

Professor Murray David Esler, AM FAA (born in 1943 in Geelong, Australia) is a clinical cardiologist and medical scientist, based at the Baker Heart and Diabetes Institute and the Alfred Hospital in Melbourne, where he is the Associate Director of the Heart Centre. He is a Professor of Medicine at Melbourne's Monash University. As Associate Director of the Baker, Professor Esler leads the Institute’s research into the relationship between the brain and heart health. He studied medicine at the University of Melbourne and received a PhD from the Australian National University (Department of Clinical Science). His chief research interests are the causes and treatment of high blood pressure and heart failure, the effects of stress on the cardiovascular system, and monoamine transmitters of the human brain.

His research on the sympathetic nerves of the kidneys in essential hypertension provided the theoretical basis for the development of a revolutionary treatment of high blood pressure, involving silencing these nerves with a radio wave emitting catheter placed in the kidney arteries. This treatment, called Renal Sympathetic Denervation, is now used clinically in Europe and Australia for severe drug-resistant hypertension, and is in Stage 3 trials in the United States.

He is the father of actor Ben Esler.

== Awards ==
Professor Esler has received the following awards for his research:

- Excellence Award in Hypertension Research, awarded by the American Heart Association in (2013).
- Bjorn Folkow Award of the European Society of Hypertension (2012).
- Eureka Prize for Translational Research, shared with Professor Markus Schlaich (2011).
- Victoria Prize, State Government of Victoria (2009)
- Member of the Order of Australia; AM (2007)
- Hamdan Award for Medical Research Excellence, awarded by Sheikh Hamdan bin Rashid Al Maktoum Award for Medical Sciences, Dubai, United Arab Emirates (2006).
- Centenary Medal (2001) of the Government of Australia.
- Elected a fellow of the Australian Academy of Science (2002).
- Hartnett Medal of the Royal Society of the Arts (2002).
- Merck Sharpe & Dohme Award of the International Society of Hypertension (2000).
- Ramaciotti Medal (1997), for excellence in biomedical research.
- RT Hall Prize (1996), for research in cardiology, awarded annually by the Cardiac Society of Australasia.
- Wellcome (Australia) Medal (1989), awarded annually for "the most outstanding biomedical research in Australia".
- Susman Prize, Royal Australasian College of Physicians (1983), awarded annually for "the best original contribution to internal medicine by a Fellow or Member of the Royal Australasian College of Physicians".
