= Downsize Me! =

- Created by: Alex Hogg
- Directed by: Stephen Baker
- Presented by: Damian Kristof; Lee-Anne Wann
- Country of origin: New Zealand
- Original language: English

Original release
- Network: TV3
- Release: August 2005 – 4 November 2008

Related
- Downsize My Pet!

Downsize Me! is a New Zealand weight and diet reality series that aired on TV3. The show focuses on informing and helping overweight New Zealanders make healthy life options, lose weight and get back into shape.

== Series overview ==
Season	Episodes	Originally released	
Season	Episodes	First released	Last released
1	TBA	August 2005	TBA
2	TBA	2007	19 June 2007
3	TBA	2 September 2008	4 November 2008

== Broadcast ==
Downsize Me! aired on Sky Livingit in the United Kingdom, and Foxtel in Australia.

== Show format ==
Each week a new obese person or couple appears on the show and is put under pressure to lose weight, change their diet and/or exercise habits to get their life back into shape, by a team of professional experts.

== See also ==
- Obesity in New Zealand
