= Obesity in New Zealand =

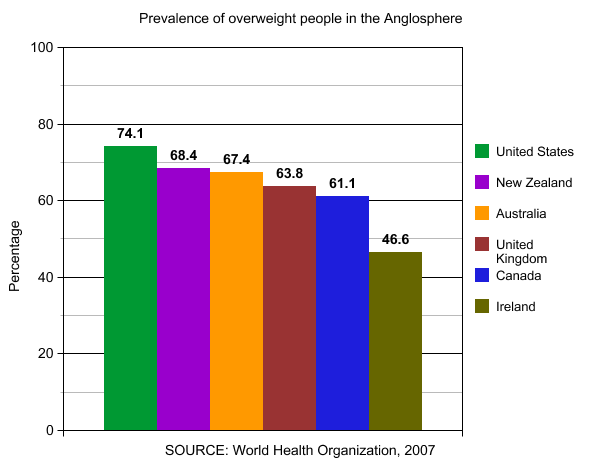
According to 2007 statistics from the World Health Organization (WHO), New Zealand has the second-highest prevalence of overweight adults in the English-speaking world.

Obesity in New Zealand has become an important national health concern in recent years, with high numbers of people afflicted in every age and ethnic group.

== Prevalence of obesity in New Zealand's population ==
As of June 2008, 26.5% of New Zealanders are obese, a number only surpassed in the English-speaking world by the United States.

=== New Zealand's Adults ===
The New Zealand Ministry of Health Survey of 2016/17 found that 34% of adults (aged 15 and over) are overweight (BMI between 25.0 and 29.9), with a further 1.2 million people (32%) being obese (BMI over 30.0), up from 29% in 2011/12.

Out of a total estimated population of 4.3 million in 2008, the Ministry's studies show that roughly 1.13 million New Zealand adults were overweight, with an extra 826,000 obese. The 2008 figures, which represent samples from 2006 and 2007, show that 25% of New Zealand adults are obese, a slight increase from 2002 and 2003 (24%) but a wide rise from 1997 (19%).

Obesity is more prevalent in New Zealand females from age 5 until the age of 34, at which time the males overtake the females in terms of percentage. After essentially coming in at a dead heat in the 55 to 64 bracket, female obesity becomes a higher risk for 65- to 74-year-olds than it does for males, only to switch odds again after 75.

The 2017 study showed that adults in deprived areas are 1.5 times more likely to become obese than those in well-off areas.

=== New Zealand's children ===
As of 2017, 21% of children (aged 2–12) are overweight, with a further 100,000 (12.3%) being obese. The child obesity rate has not changed significantly since 2011/12 (when it was 10.7%), although it has increased since 2006/07 (8.4%).

In 2004, over 30 percent of children in New Zealand were classified as overweight. In the 2008 figures, 8.3% of children ages 5 to 14 in New Zealand were classified as obese. While more numerous than the same demographic in Australia (between 5 and 6%), the number of obese children actually declined from a record high of 9% set in 2002. Starting in 2006, the government has worked to cut high-fat foods and high sugar drinks from school cafeterias, and also to curb advertising for junk food during daytime television hours, these moves are being credited with slowing the rate of obesity in New Zealand, especially among the young.

The 2017 study showed that children in deprived areas are 2.5 times more likely to become obese than those in well-off areas.

=== Māori, Asians, and Pacific Islanders ===
In the 2008 report, adults of Māori and other Polynesian descent had a much higher rate of obesity than white New Zealanders. The rate for the Pacific peoples were nearly triple the white average, while Māori reported nearly double the white rate. As of 2017, 50% of Māori adults, 18% of Māori children, 69% of Polynesian adults, and 29% of Polynesian children are obese. In 2008, 65% of adult Pacific New Zealanders and 43% of adult Māori were obese, compared to 23% of white adults, and 12% of Asian New Zealanders were obese. Out of all the ethnic groups surveyed, only the Asians reported a large increase in obesity from the 2002 statistics.

== See also ==
- Health in New Zealand
- Epidemiology of obesity
- List of countries by body mass index
- Downsize Me!
