= HealthConnect =

HealthConnect has been Australia’s change management strategy to transition from paper-based and legacy digital health records towards electronic health records planned system of electronic health records.

The long-term goal of the HealthConnect strategy is to deliver better health outcomes through standardised, sharable clinical information. The "better health outcomes" would translate to improved quality and safety in health care and disease prevention. These would be achieved by ensuring important clinical information is available and of high quality, when and where it is needed.

Trials were carried out as part of the HealthConnect strategy in various parts of Australia during 2004. These included an EHR pilot in South Brisbane and a surgical patient information sharing trial at Townsville University Hospital. In 2005 trials were conducted in Tasmania at the Launceston General Hospital and across the Northern Territory. Defunct research consortium Distributed Systems Technology Centre (DSTC) was awarded a A$2.9 million contract to develop technology for HealthConnect. After the first round of trials the vision for HeathConnect was greatly altered. In 2007 a second phase of testing began.

The NT Health Connect Trial was largely successful and is "the most advanced eHealth implementations of their kind in Australia in terms of range of services, service coverage and consumer and health professional participation", according to their website. The project was upgraded and renamed "Shared Electronic Health Record". A 2008 review of SEHR found it to be rated very highly among end users, accelerated rollouts and upgrades continued through 2009 and 2010. Of particular note was the ability for SEHR to achieve an estimated 90% uptake of residents from participating remote indigenous communities. (In such communities, it is difficult to maintain accurate records. The 2011 Census, for example, had focused action towards remote communities in an attempt to identify the extent of this problem)

== See also ==
- Electronic health record
