= National Centre for Immunisation Research and Surveillance =

Australian research organisation

The National Centre for Immunisation Research and Surveillance of Vaccine Preventable Diseases (NCIRS) is an Australian research organisation focusing on vaccine-preventable diseases and immunisation. The NCIRS engages in research and surveillance of vaccine-preventable diseases, vaccine coverage, and vaccine safety, as well as evaluation and advising of vaccination programs.

Since 2019, the NCIRS has been a member of Vaccine Safety Net (VSN), a global network of websites established by the World Health Organization (WHO).

== History ==
The NCIRS was created in August 1997 by the Australian Government Department of Health (then named the Australian Government Department of Health and Ageing). It was formed as a part of Immunise Australia, also known as the National Immunisation Program, a program to increase immunisation rates in the country. Concerns had been raised after an outbreak of whooping cough that year and surveys had found that only 85% of children were vaccinated with the pertussis vaccine.

The founding director was Professor Margaret Burgess, who established serosurveillance and prioritised the monitoring of safety of vaccines. She was succeeded in 2004 by Professor Peter McIntyre. The current director is Professor Kristine Macartney.

A series of adverse effects from one brand of influenza vaccine in 2010 led to the 2014 establishment of AusVaxSafety, an entity actively monitoring adverse effects from vaccines that is led by NCIRS.

NCIRS receives its core funding from the Australian and New South Wales governments. It is located at Royal Alexandra Hospital for Children in Sydney, and has obtained additional funding from the National Health and Medical Research Council (NHMRC). It has links with the Mass-gathering medicine node at the University of Sydney.
