= Diabetes in Australia =

Health issue in Australia

Evolution of the age-standardized prevalence of diabetes in Australia, from 1980 to 2014.

Diabetes in Australia is somewhat common, with an estimated 275 Australians developing diabetes every day. The 2005 Australian AusDiab Follow-up Study (Australian Diabetes, Obesity and Lifestyle Study) showed that 1.7 million Australians have diabetes but that up to half of the cases of type 2 diabetes remain undiagnosed.

In 2024, the Australian Institute of Health and Welfare reported that around 1.3 million Australians or 5.1% of the population were living with diagnosed diabetes as of 2021. Sharply increasing from 400,000 diagnosed cases in 2001. For Australians aged 80-84, this number reached 19%. It is considered one of the top 10 leading causes of death in Australia.

== Type 2 ==
Type 2 diabetes is the most common type of diabetes, and majority of those affected are diagnosed with Type 2. Type 2 diabetes is classified as a lifestyle disease which is impacted by environmental and hereditary factors. This form of diabetes is significantly affected by the lifestyle the individual has. It is associated with the individuals' diet and activity level. The population who are most at risk are those who adopt a sedentary lifestyle at a young age.

=== Prevention ===
- Maintaining a healthy weight
- Regular physical activity
- Managing blood pressure
- Managing cholesterol levels
- Quit/ Avoid smoking

Although there is no direct cure for Type 2 diabetes the Australian Government: Department of Health has put in place guidelines to assure that children and adolescents receive the suggested period of time engaging in physical activity. Some of their suggestions are as follows:

- shift from a low to moderate activity level
- participate in more vigorous activity rather than moderate intensity exercise- you will save time and therefore have more time for friends and family
- avoid long periods of screen time (devices including TV, Phone, etc.)
- avoid long sitting sessions

== Diabetes facts ==
Other facts about diabetes include:

- Every year 0.8% of adults developed diabetes.
- Every day in Australia approximately 275 adults develop diabetes.
- Those with pre-diabetes were 10-20 times more likely to develop diabetes than were those with normal blood glucose levels.
- Obesity, hypertension, dyslipidaemia, physical inactivity and the metabolic syndrome each increased the risk for developing diabetes.

In 2007–08 approximately 520,000 people had diabetes and CVD meaning only 42% of diabetics did not have CVD. CVD is the major cause of mortality in people suffering from diabetes with CVD accounting for 80% of deaths.

The International Diabetes Federation has estimated that currently 194 million people worldwide, or 5.1% within the adult population have diabetes; this will jump to 333 million, or 6.3%, by 2025. Type 2 Diabetes makes up approximately 85% to 95% of all diabetes in developed countries, and is even higher in developing countries.

The European Region, with 48 million, and Western Pacific Region, with 43 million, has the most people with diabetes currently. In 2025, the region with the largest number of people with diabetes will change to the South-East Asian Region with approximately 82 million sufferers.

Right now the age group with the greatest number of people suffering from diabetes are the 40- to 59-year-olds. Owing to the ageing population, by 2025 there will be 146 million people aged 40–59 and 147 million people aged 60 or older with diabetes.

In 2003, the number of people with diabetes in urban areas was 78 million and by 2025 it is said to increase to 182 million urban and 61 million rural people with diabetes.

=== Epidemiology ===
==== Indigenous Australians ====
A University of Alberta study, conducted in 2006, noted that 60% of Aboriginal people over the age of 35 in Western Australia tested positive for diabetes.

==== Migrant populations ====
A study conducted by the International Diabetes Institute at Monash University showed that Asians, Pacific Islanders, and Middle Eastern immigrants who moved to Australia were diagnosed with diabetes at a higher level than the average. The increase was explained by the adoption of a Western diet in place of a more healthy "traditional" diet more common in their native countries, as well as adopting a more sedentary lifestyle which is ubiquitous in developed countries.

=== National Diabetes Services Scheme ===
The National Diabetes Services Scheme (NDSS) is administered by Diabetes Australia on behalf of the Commonwealth Government. It was established in 1987 and is an Australian Government program that delivers diabetes-related products at subsidised prices to its registrants. The NDSS also provides information and support services to people with type 1, type 2, gestational and other types of diabetes. The Scheme provides services to around 1.7 million Australians.

State and territory diabetes organisations are also assisting in the arrangements and planning of services for this scheme.

The NDSS aims to ensure appropriate, reliable and affordable access to diabetes-related products and services to support people suffering from diabetes.

== See also ==
- Obesity in Australia
- Heart disease in Australia
- Health in Australia
