= Slip-Slop-Slap =

Health campaign slogan

Sid the Seagull, mascot character for the campaign

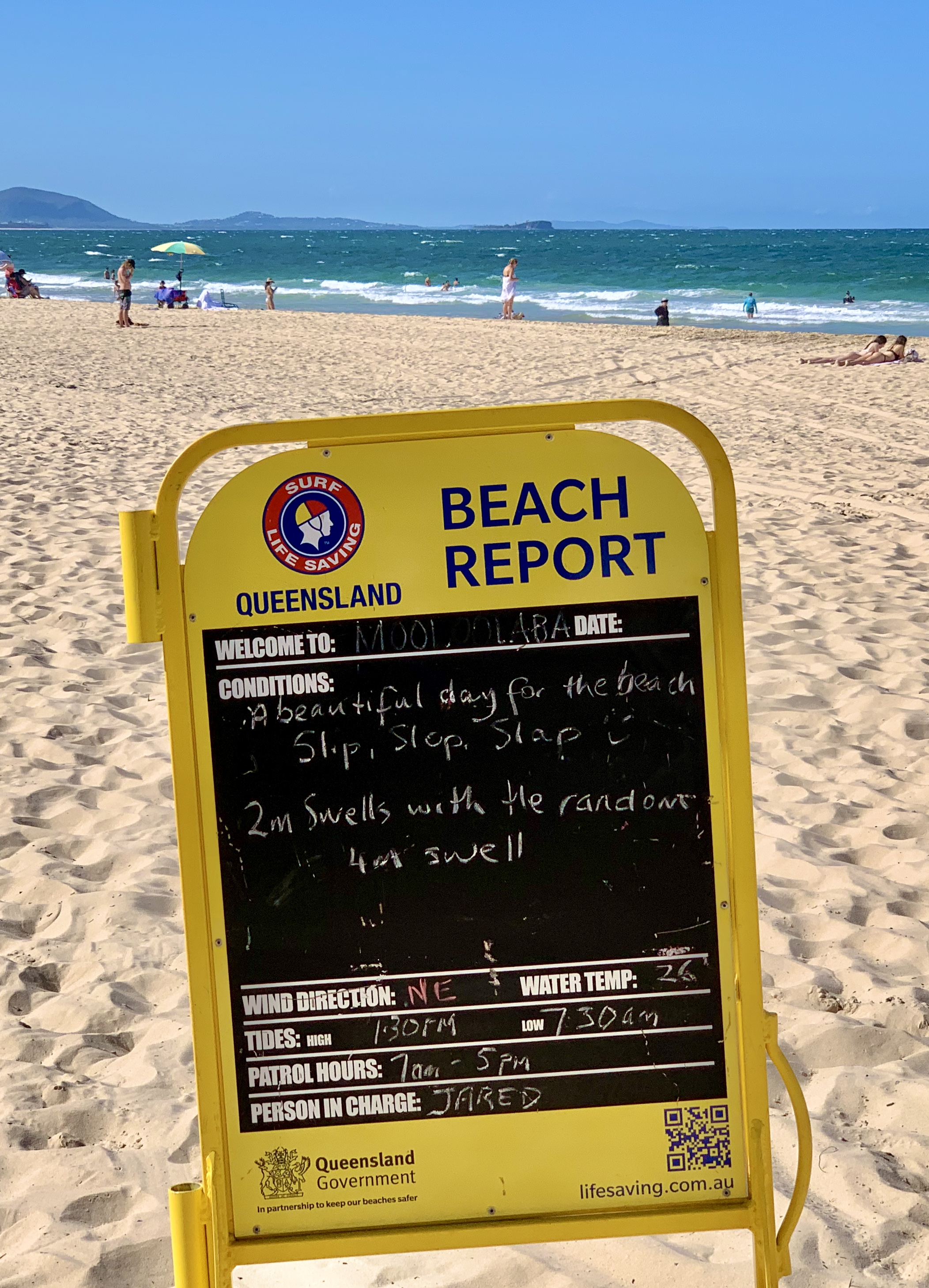
“A beautiful day for the beach Slip, Slop, Slap” slogan at Mooloolaba Beach, Queensland, 2020

Slip-Slop-Slap (originally Slip! Slop! Drop!) is a mnemonic slogan for reducing unhealthy sun exposure by slipping on a shirt or rash guard, slopping on sunscreen, and slapping on a sun hat. It was prominent in Australia and New Zealand during the 1980s, originating as the jingle in a televised public service announcement in which an anthropomorphic mascot named Sid the Seagull would sing and dance to the phrase.

The campaign, originally funded by public donations, was launched by Cancer Council Victoria in 1981 to combat high rates of skin cancer in Australia, and achieved high nationwide awareness over its original run. It was briefly and less successfully revived in 2010, with Sid the Seagull singing to a revised jingle "Slip, Slop, Slap, Seek and Slide", adding seeking shade and sliding on wraparound sunglasses to the advice. An alternate version known as "Slip, Slop, Slap and Wrap" was used in New Zealand, where the mascot was a tiger prawn named Tiger, voiced by Anthony Samuels from What Now. Some Canadian cities have also started their own Slip-Slop-Slap campaigns. In Britain, it was featured in a BBC Breakfast report on 27 June 2011.

In November 2023, the National Film and Sound Archive added the Slip! Slop! Slap! Jingle performed by Peter Best and Phillip Adams to the Sounds of Australia register for songs of "cultural, historical and aesthetic significance and relevance".

== Effect on cancer rates ==
Since this campaign was introduced along with advertisements and a jingle, the incidence of the two most common forms of skin cancer (basal-cell carcinoma and squamous cell carcinoma) in Australia has decreased. However, the incidence of melanoma, the most lethal form of skin cancer, has increased. However, statistical analysis from the Australian Government's Australian Institute of Health and Welfare found this increased incidence risk is almost entirely in the older (over-60 years) population, who lived the majority of their lives before the importance of sun safety was widely known, whereas the rate of incidence of melanoma by age 30 has consistently dropped from its peak in 1997, having halved in the time to 2020. Meanwhile, risk of melanoma incidence by age 60 has remained stable since 2011. An epidemiological study published in 2002 concluded that skin cancer increases could not be associated with the use of sun creams, and recommended continued use of the current campaigns as a means to reduce melanoma risk.

Decades of skin cancer prevention in Australia shows public education programs can improve a population's sun protective behaviors and reducing sunburn, a short-term marker of skin cancer risk. Declining skin cancer incidence in youth show skin cancer prevention programs are working.

== See also ==
- Health effects of sun exposure
- Skin cancer in Australia
