= Vitillo =

Vitillo is a surname. Notable people with the surname include:

- Matilde Vitillo (born 2001), Italian female cyclist
- Robert J. Vitillo (born 1946), American priest
