= Anne Gallagher =

Australian lawyer and activist

Anne Therese Gallagher AO

Director-General of the Commonwealth Foundation
- Incumbent
- Assumed office June 2019
- Monarch: Queen Elizabeth II
- Preceded by: Vijay Krishnarayan

President of the International Catholic Migration Commission
- Incumbent
- Assumed office March 2018
- Preceded by: Peter Sutherland GCIH KCMG SC

Academic Expert at Doughty Street Chambers
- Incumbent
- Assumed office 2016

Member: IOM Migration Advisory Board
- In office 2014–2018

Member: Asia Dialogue on Forced Migration
- Incumbent
- Assumed office 2014

Co-Chair of the International Bar Association's Presidential Force on Human Trafficking
- In office 2014–2016

Co-Chair of the International Bar Association's Presidential Force on Human Trafficking
- In office 2014–2016

Anne Therese Gallagher AO is an Australian lawyer who since 2019 has been the director-general of the Commonwealth Foundation. She is a former President (2018–2022) of the International Catholic Migration Commission, Co-Chair of the International Bar Association's Presidential Task Force on Human Trafficking, and member of the Asia Dialogue on Forced Migration. She is considered to be an international authority on transnational criminal law, migration and human rights and, according to the 2012 Trafficking in Persons Report prepared by the United States Department of State, is "the leading global expert on the international law on human trafficking".

== Education ==
Gallagher was educated in Sydney at Santa Sabina College. She then studied at Macquarie University, Sydney, graduating with a Bachelor of Arts (political science and international relations) in 1984 and a Bachelor of Laws in 1987. She completed a Master of International Law at the Australian National University in 1991. In 2006, Gallagher obtained a Doctor of Philosophy from the University of Utrecht, Netherlands.

== Career ==
Gallagher was admitted as a solicitor of the Supreme Court of New South Wales in 1988 and as a barrister and solicitor of the High Court of Australia in 1988 and of the Supreme Court of the Australian Capital Territory in 1990. From 1990 to 1992, Gallagher was a lecturer in the Australian National University's Graduate International Law Program.

Gallagehr was a United Nations Official from 1992 to 2003 and was adviser to Mary Robinson, the United Nations High Commissioner for Human Rights, from 1998 to 2002. During her tenure, Gallagher represented Robinson at the negotiations for the United Nations Convention against Transnational Organized Crime as well as its protocols on trafficking and migrant smuggling. In 2001–2002, she led the development of the United Nations Principles and Guidelines on Human Rights and Human Trafficking and during that same period was the founding Chair of the United Nations Inter-Agency Group on Human Trafficking and Migrant Smuggling.

From 2003 to 2018, Gallagher held various leadership positions in a regional development initiative, funded by the Australian Government's International Aid Program aimed at strengthening legislative and criminal justice responses to trafficking in persons and related exploitation in all ten Association of Southeast Asian Nations (ASEAN) Member States. The US State Department cited Gallagher's contribution to this Project, which they note has been 'widely acclaimed for its positive impact on laws, policies and practices within and outside the Association of Southeast Asian Nations (ASEAN) region'. The ASEAN Secretary-General, Surin Pitsuwan, also noted Gallagher's contribution, stating, "Dr Gallagher's expertise in this field, particularly in the area of criminal justice responses to trafficking, is recognised and deeply appreciated throughout the ASEAN region. ... It is not wrong to say that the achievements that ASEAN, as a region, is enjoying in the criminal justice response to the heinous crime of trafficking are in no small part due to Dr Gallagher's persevering efforts and her compassion towards ASEAN."

Gallagher is also an independent, self-funded scholar with research and publications related to human rights, criminal justice and the rule of law, and the international law on human trafficking. She has published articles in the International Criminal Justice Review, Human Rights Quarterly, Virginia Journal of International Law and the Anti-Trafficking Review. Gallagher is the author of The International Law of Human Trafficking published by Cambridge University Press and awarded the 2011 American Society of International Law Certificate of Merit – Honorable Mention. She is also the lead author of the companion volume "The International Law of Migrant Smuggling" published by Cambridge University Press and described by the American Journal of International Law, as "a tour de force".

Gallagher has been a panellist, expert and rapporteur at international and national governmental and non-governmental consultations, meetings, workshops and other fora, and has been a guest speaker and lecturer at universities, and commented for, or been cited by, media. She has contributed opinion pieces to The Guardian and the World Economic Forum. Gallagher is also a regular critical commentator on the annual US State Department Trafficking in Persons Report, and has been scathing of related efforts to quantify the problem of "'modern slavery'" and assess national responses. Gallagher has reported being threatened with legal action following her criticism, in the Huffington Post, of "a US-based organization that stages high profile, ethically compromised 'rescue' operations in impoverished countries". Since 2014, Gallagher has been a semi-regular contributor to The Spectator magazine, writing on topics including the United Nations, freedom of speech, and migration.

Gallagher continued to advise the United Nations after her formal departure. Outputs included the commentary to the United Nations Recommended Principles and Guidelines on Human Rights and Human Trafficking and a series of legal issue papers produced by the United Nations Office on Drugs and Crime.

== Recognition, awards and appointments ==
Gallagher was the recipient of the Anti-Slavery Australia Freedom Award in 2011. In June 2012, she was appointed Officer of the Order of Australia (AO) for her "distinguished service to the law, and to human rights, as a practitioner, teacher and scholar, particularly in the areas of human trafficking responses and criminal justice." Also in June 2012, she was named a "2012 TIP Report Hero" by the United States Government for her work in the global fight against human trafficking.

In 2014, Gallagher commenced as co-chair of the International Bar Association's Presidential Task Force on Human Trafficking. Also in 2014 she was appointed to the International Migration Organization's Migration Advisory Board, convened by its Director General William L. Swing. In 2016, Gallagher joined Doughty Street Chambers as an Academic Expert. She is also a founding member of the Asia Dialogue on Forced Migration.

In March 2018, Gallagher was elected President of the International Catholic Migration Commission succeeding former Goldman Sachs Chairman and UN Special Representative on migration Sir Peter Sutherland. In her public pronouncements as president, Gallagher called for an "honest dialogue" on migration to confront the "globalization of indifference".

In April 2019, Gallagher was appointed Director-General of the Commonwealth Foundation by its 46 Member States, becoming the first women to occupy this post in the Foundation's 70-year history.
