= Santa Sabina College =

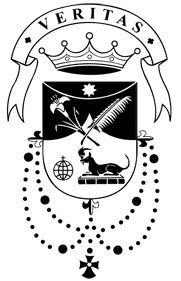

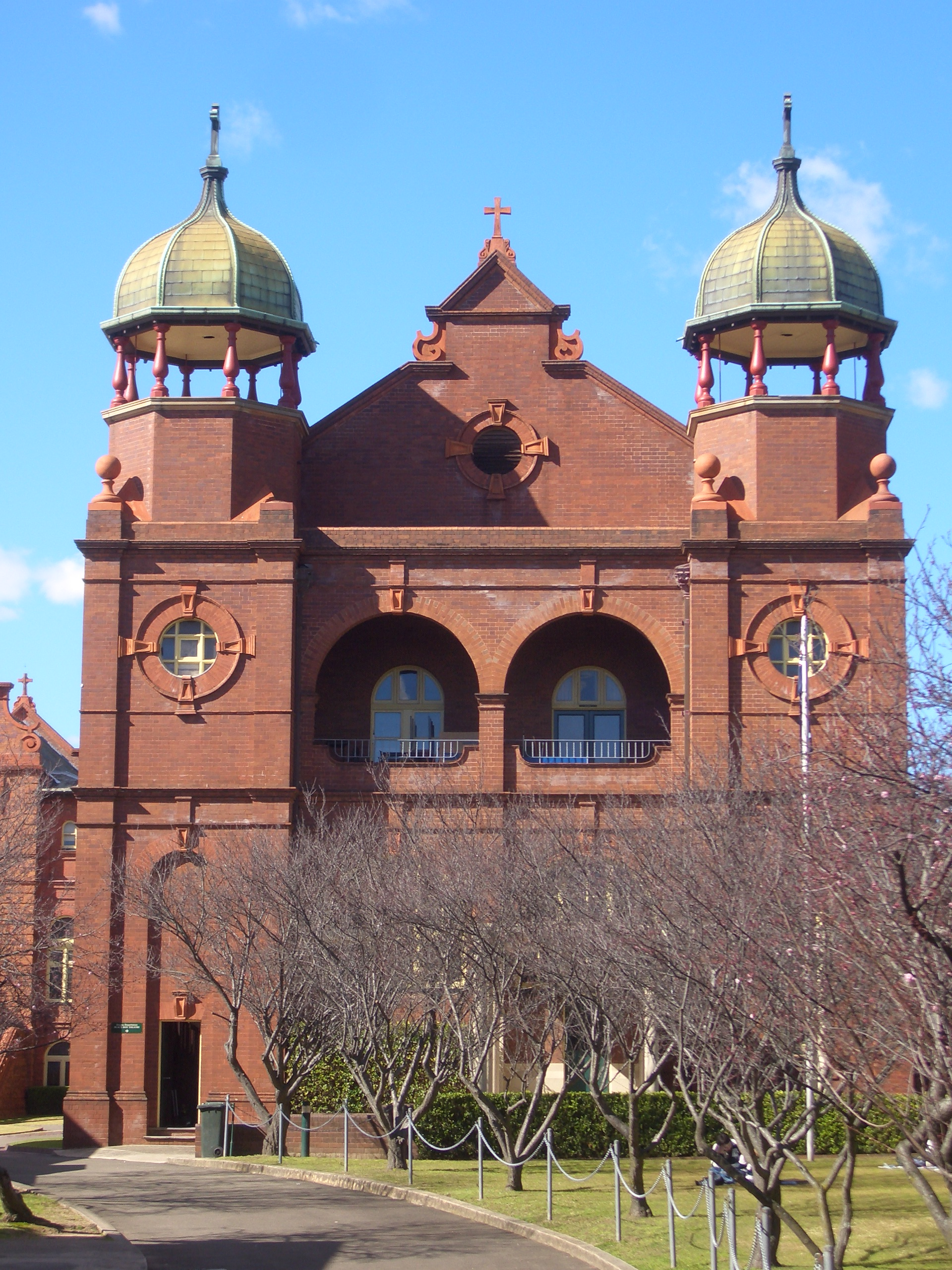
- 1894 Santa Sabina College building, pictured in 2007

Location
- Strathfield, Inner West Sydney and Tallong, Southern Highlands, New South Wales; Australia; 33°52′39″S 151°5′42″E

Information
- Type: Independent co-educational and single-sex early learning, primary, and secondary day school
- Motto: Latin: Veritas (Truth)
- Religious affiliation: Dominican Order
- Denomination: Roman Catholic
- Established: Enrolment for boys and Girls
- Educational authority: New South Wales Department of Education
- Oversight: Archdiocese of Sydney
- Chairperson: Kitty Guerin
- Principal: Paulina Skerman
- Staff: ~127
- Years: P–12
- Gender: Co-educational (P–4); Girls (5–12)
- Enrolment: $8,290–$24,480 (2020)
- Campus: Strathfield: Mary Bailey House (Early learning); Santa Maria del Monte (Primary school); Martin de Porres (Middle school); Santa Sabina (Senior school); Tallong (Outdoor education)
- Campus type: Suburban and regional
- Colours: Black, white and red
- Slogan: Shake the world
- Nickname: Santa
- Affiliations: Association of Heads of Independent Girls' Schools; Junior School Heads Association of Australia; Association of Heads of Independent Schools of Australia
- Brother school: St Patrick's College, Strathfield
- Website: www.ssc.nsw.edu.au

Santa Sabina College (abbreviated as Santa, Santa Sabina or SSC) is a multi-campus independent Roman Catholic, single-sex, early learning, primary and secondary day school for girls from Year 5 to Year 12; and a co-educational day school from early learning years through Prep to Year 4. Located on eight hectares in Strathfield, an inner-western suburb of Sydney; and on 97 hectares in Tallong, in the Southern Highlands of New South Wales, Australia; students are educated in the Dominican tradition. Established in 1894, Santa Sabina has a non-selective enrolment policy and as of 2007 catered to approximately 1,400 students.

Santa Sabina College is an independent Catholic school jointly owned by Dominican Education Australia. Prior to 2024, the College was owned by the Congregation of Dominican Sisters of Eastern Australia and the Solomon Islands. The College is affiliated with the Association of Heads of Independent Schools of Australia (AHISA), the Junior School Heads Association of Australia (JSHAA) and an affiliate member of the Association of Heads of Independent Girls' Schools (AHIGS). The College Principal is Paulina Skerman.

== History ==
Eight Dominican sisters arrived from Ireland in 1867, to establish schools for Catholic children in New South Wales. Subsequently 3 hectares (6.5 acres) of land and a house in Strathfield were purchased from a wine-grower, Harold Lindeman. Santa Sabina College was established on this site in January 1894, with seven day students. The first three boarders were enrolled in April of that same year.

Although the College saw its first student matriculate in 1906, it was not officially recognised as a secondary school until 1912, with the passing of the New South Wales Bursary Act. Organised sport was first introduced in 1918, with Tennis the most popular sport at the time.

In 1936, Santa's most prominent building, Holyrood—originally built as Illyria by industrialist Charles Hoskins in the early 1890s—was purchased from William Adams of the Tattersall's Hotel. The carved sandstone facade came from the City Bank building in Moore Street (now Martin Place). This building was used as the College boarding house until boarding ceased in 1976. The building now houses the College music department. The Del Monte property, located across the road from the College, was leased in 1949, with the first primary school students taking up residence later that year. In 1950, the owner of the property, Mary Bailey, died, leaving the property to the Sisters. Del Monte was subsequently renamed Santa Maria del Monte. Santa Maria del Monte was expanded in 1968, with the purchase of Lauriston, which had been the home of the Presbyterian Ladies' College, Sydney during the Second World War. This purchase provided the school with a sports ground and additional classrooms.

In 1991 the campus was used as the backdrop for the Australian TV series Brides of Christ.

1996 saw the establishment of the Out of School Hours Centre (OOSH), and in 1997, a property at Tallong was purchased for outdoor education. In 1998, Mary Bailey House was opened as an Early Childhood Centre, and in 2002 classes for Years 6 and 7 commenced at the middle school campus, Martin De Porres.

Santa Sabina is recognised as an employer of choice for women by the Equal Opportunity for Women in the Workplace Agency.

== Principals ==
The following individuals have served as Principal of Santa Sabina College:

Ordinal	Officeholder	Term start	Term end	Time in office	Notes
1	M. Bertrand Walsh	1894	1894	0 years	
2	M. Pius Collins	1895	1900	4–5 years	
(1)	M. Bertrand Walsh	1901	1906	4–5 years	
(2)	M. Pius Collins	1907	1913	5–6 years	
3	M. Teresa Casey	1914	1922	7–8 years	
4	M. Philippa Byrne	1923	1924	0–1 years	
5	M. Gonsalvo Byrne	1925	1929	3–4 years	
6	M. Benignus Baker	1930	1930	0 years	
7	M. Concepta O'Donohue	1931	1935	3–4 years	
(4)	M. Philippa Byrne	1936	1941	4–5 years	
8	M. St John Hewit	1954	1960	5–6 years	
9	M. St Luke McKervey	1961	1964	2–3 years	
10	Diana Woods (M. Julie)	1965	1967	4–5 years	
11	Anne Banfield (M. Joseph)	1968	1970	1–2 years	
(10)	Diana Woods (M. Julie)	1973	1973	0 years	
12	Mary Britt (M. Reginald)	1971	1972	0–1 years	
13	Delma Richardson (M. Leo)	1974	1979	4–5 years	
14	Rosemary Lewins	1980	1986	5–6 years	
15	Judith Lawson	1987	2007	19–20 years	
16	Kate Clancy	2008	2012	3–4 years	
17	Maree Herrett	2012	2019	13–14 years	
18	Paulina Skerman	2020	–	5–6 years	

The current principal, Ms Skerman was previously, the principal at an independent, Catholic, girls' secondary day and boarding school for 5 years. She is a member of the Australian Heads of Independent Schools and the Alliance of Girls' Schools Australasia. In 2017, she was named as a Finalist in the Telstra Business Women's Award for leading growth and inclusivity through innovation.

== Campus ==
The College comprises five campuses: four situated along The Boulevarde in Strathfield, and an outdoor education campus at Tallong in the Southern Highlands of New South Wales. The four city campuses are Mary Bailey House Early Education Centre (Pre-school), Santa Maria del Monte (Kindergarten to Year 4), Gioia House (Years 5 & 6) and Santa Sabina (Senior Years). Santa Maria del Monte also takes boy students from Kindergarten to Year 4, with most boys then continuing on to St. Patrick's College to complete their schooling.

The Strathfield campus includes a 33-metre (108 ft) outdoor swimming pool, six tennis courts, three ovals and a chapel. In 2002, a Middle School was established for students in Years 6 and 7. In 2005 The Aquinas Centre was opened, featuring a library, lecture theatre and student services facility. In 2025, St Lucy's @ Santa, a satellite campus of St Lucy's School – for students with disabilities, was set up within Santa Sabina in the St Dominic Building.

== Co-curricular activities ==
=== Debating ===
The College debating activities include: The Archdale Competition for Years 7 to 12, against twenty similar type independent girls' schools; the AHIGS Festival of Speech; the Catholic Schools' Debating competition; Schools' Speaking competition; the Catholic Schools' Speaking competition; the Junior Legacy Speaking competition; Senior Plain English Speaking competition; and the Rostrum Voice of Youth Competition.

Middle and Secondary School students participate in social debates with schools such as St Gregory's College, Campbelltown, Saint Ignatius' College, Riverview, and St Vincent's College, whilst the Primary and Middle School debate MLC School and PLC Sydney.

Debating and Public Speaking is also offered through inter-house competitions.

=== Arts ===
Santa Sabina is seen as the sister school to St Patrick's College. As such the two schools combine drama classes to stage shows, and musicals.

=== Sport ===
The sporting program at Santa Sabina includes: School sporting clubs, Saturday and midweek competitions, gala days, and representative opportunities up to national level. Each year the College takes about 2500 sports registrations for approximately 85 sports competitions and activities across 22 sports.

== Controversies ==
The school was the subject of international news coverage following the suicide of Charlotte O'Brien, a 12-year-old student enrolled at the school, following allegations of years of "relentless bullying" in September 2024. The school administration was accused of failing to respond to reports of the bullying, and public outcries mounted over the school's alleged inaction in the aftermath. In the days following, some former and current parents and students of the school have come forward to question the school's handling of the incident and whether enough was being done to tackle the issue of bullying.

A former staff member at the school took their own life earlier in 2024 and had informed their family there was "a culture of bullying at the school".

Principal Paulina Skerman responded to these reports, "suggestions of a culture of bullying at the college are confronting and go against the very fabric of our faith and the way we live our lives" clarifying, "they are certainly contrary to what we have witnessed in our community over the last few weeks." Skerman said the allegations are "new claims to the College and are not consistent with school records," though O'Brien's parents said they sent several emails to the school, the first in August 2022, that "begged" the school to intervene.

== Notable alumni ==
- Monica Attard, ABC broadcaster and academic
- Frances Bedford, politician in South Australia
- Robyn Butler, writer, actress and producer
- Margaret Cunneen SC, Prosecutor
- Carmen Duncan, actress
- Paula Duncan, actress
- Cathy Foley, Australia's Chief Scientist 2021-2024
- Anne Gallagher AO, president of the International Catholic Migration Commission
- Georgina Long AO, melanoma oncologist, Australian of the Year 2024
- Julia Morris, actress/comedian
- Rahni Sadler, ABC news reporter
- Anne Schofield AM, antique jewellery dealer
- Justine Schofield, television personality
- Alice Spigelman AM, clinical psychologist and writer
- Yvonne Strahovski, actress
- Simone Thurtell, ABC grandstand announcer

== Notable staff ==
- Anne Philomena O'Brien, author
- Melina Marchetta, bestselling author of "Looking for Alibrandi"

== Gallery ==
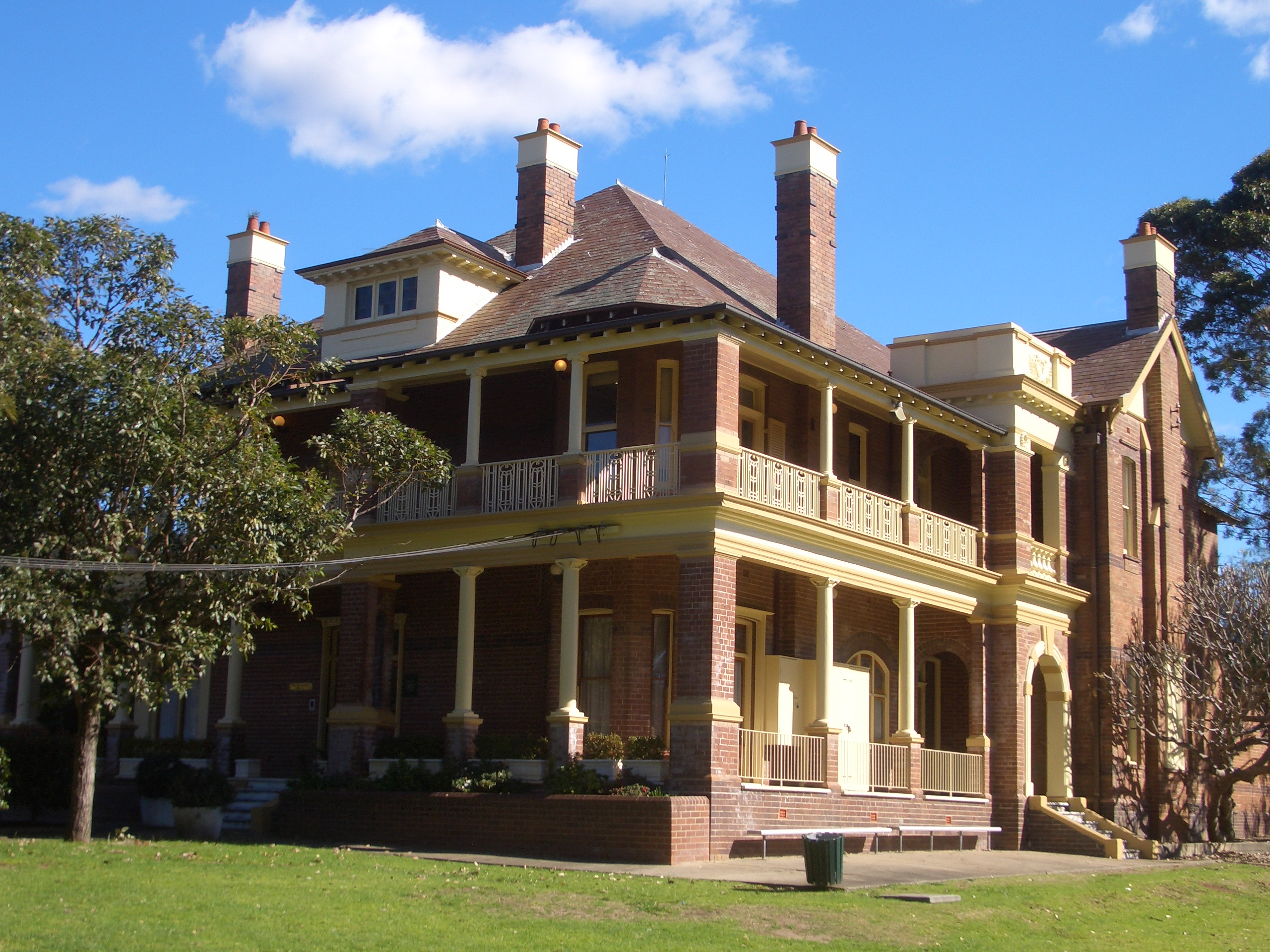
Lauriston

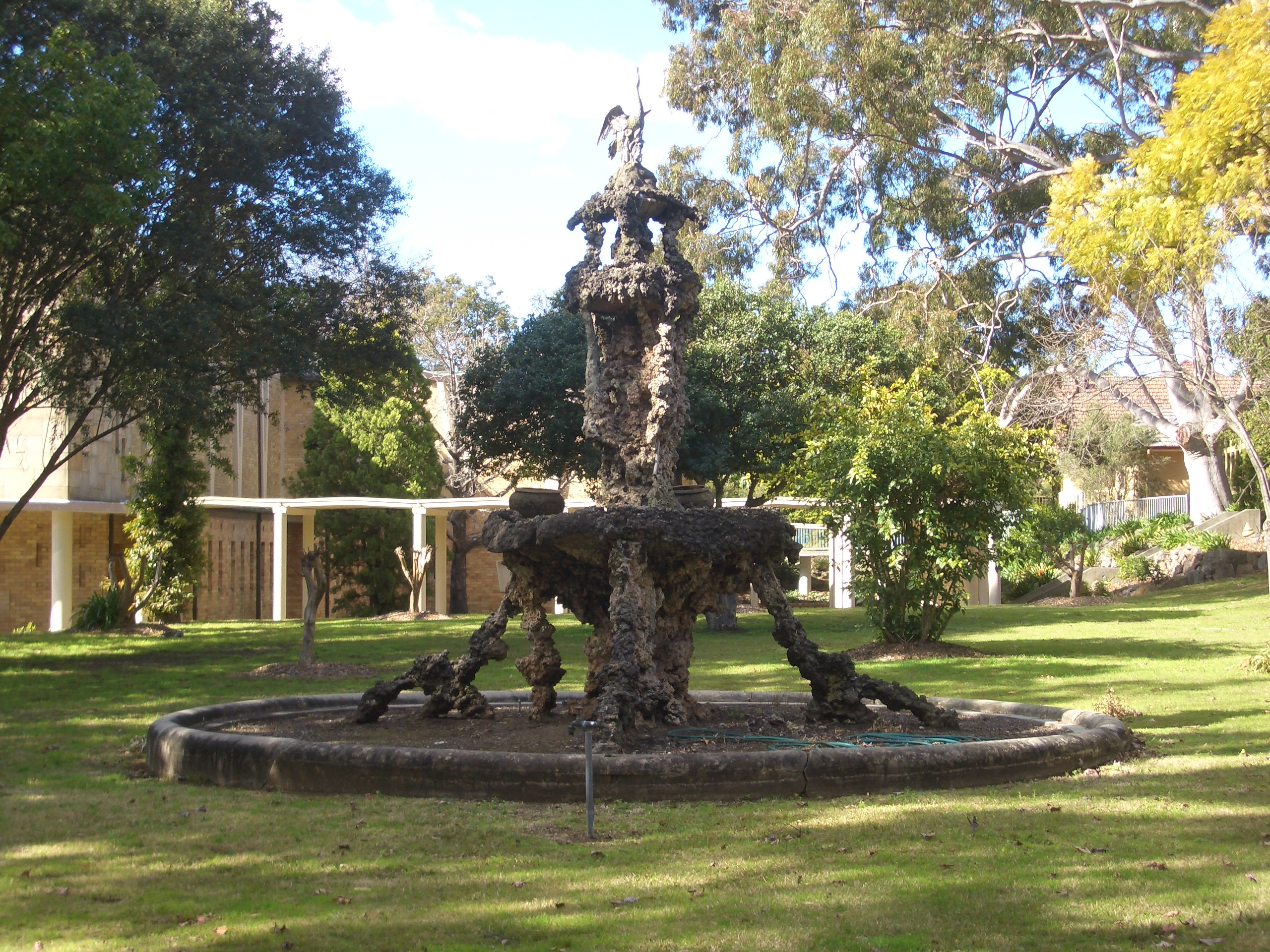
A sculpture in the College grounds, pictured in 2007

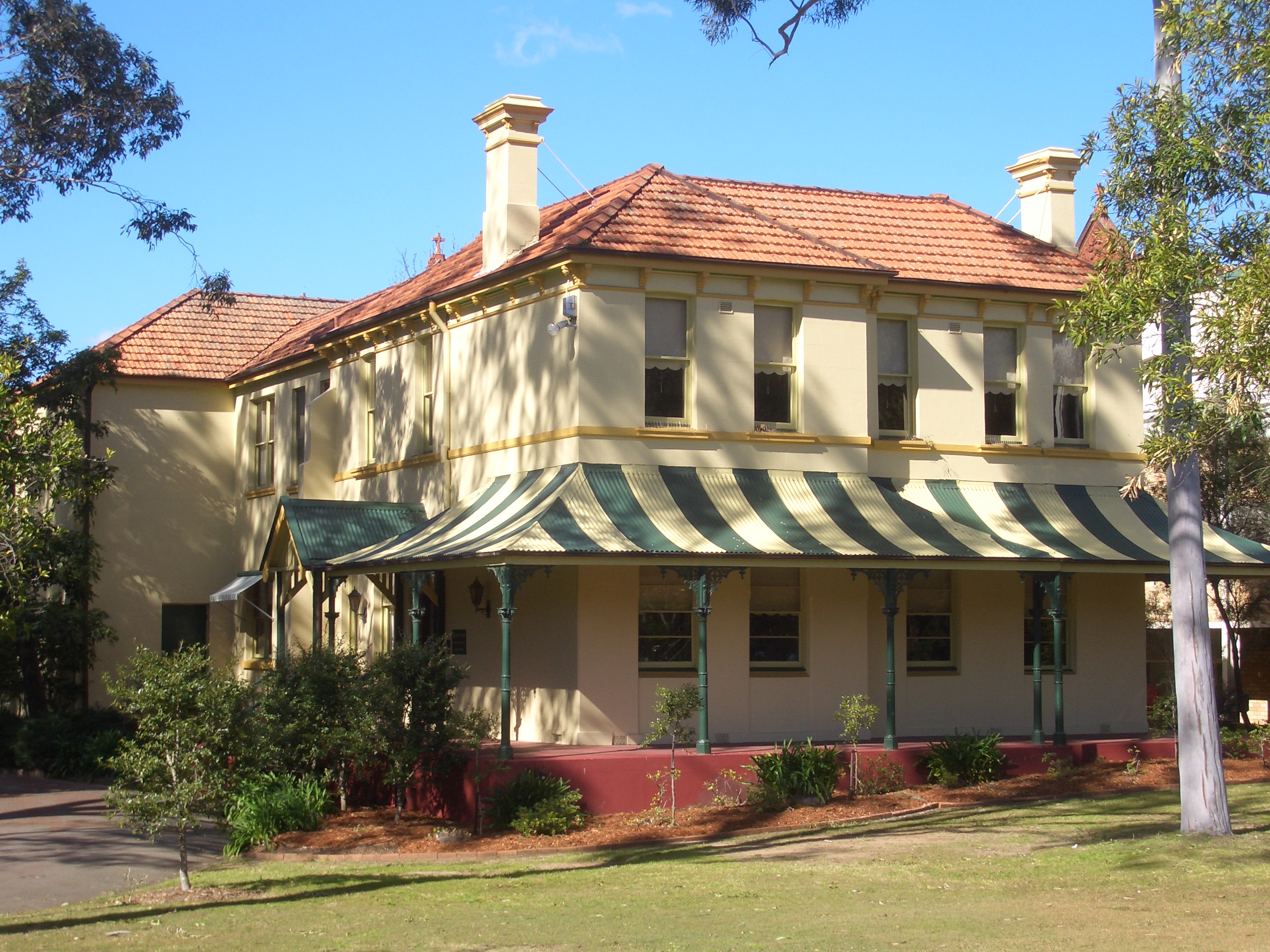
A College building, pictured in 2007

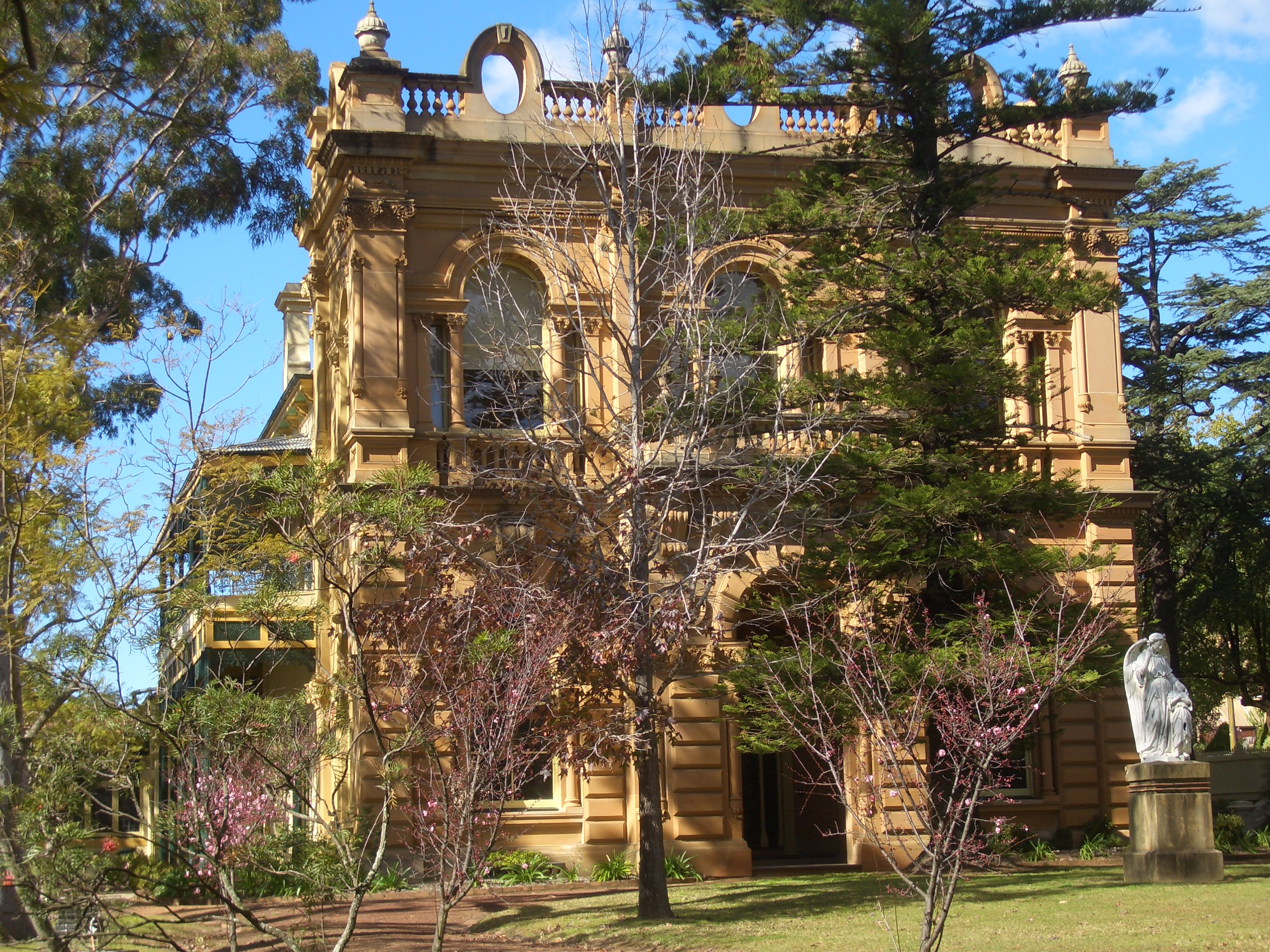
Holyrood

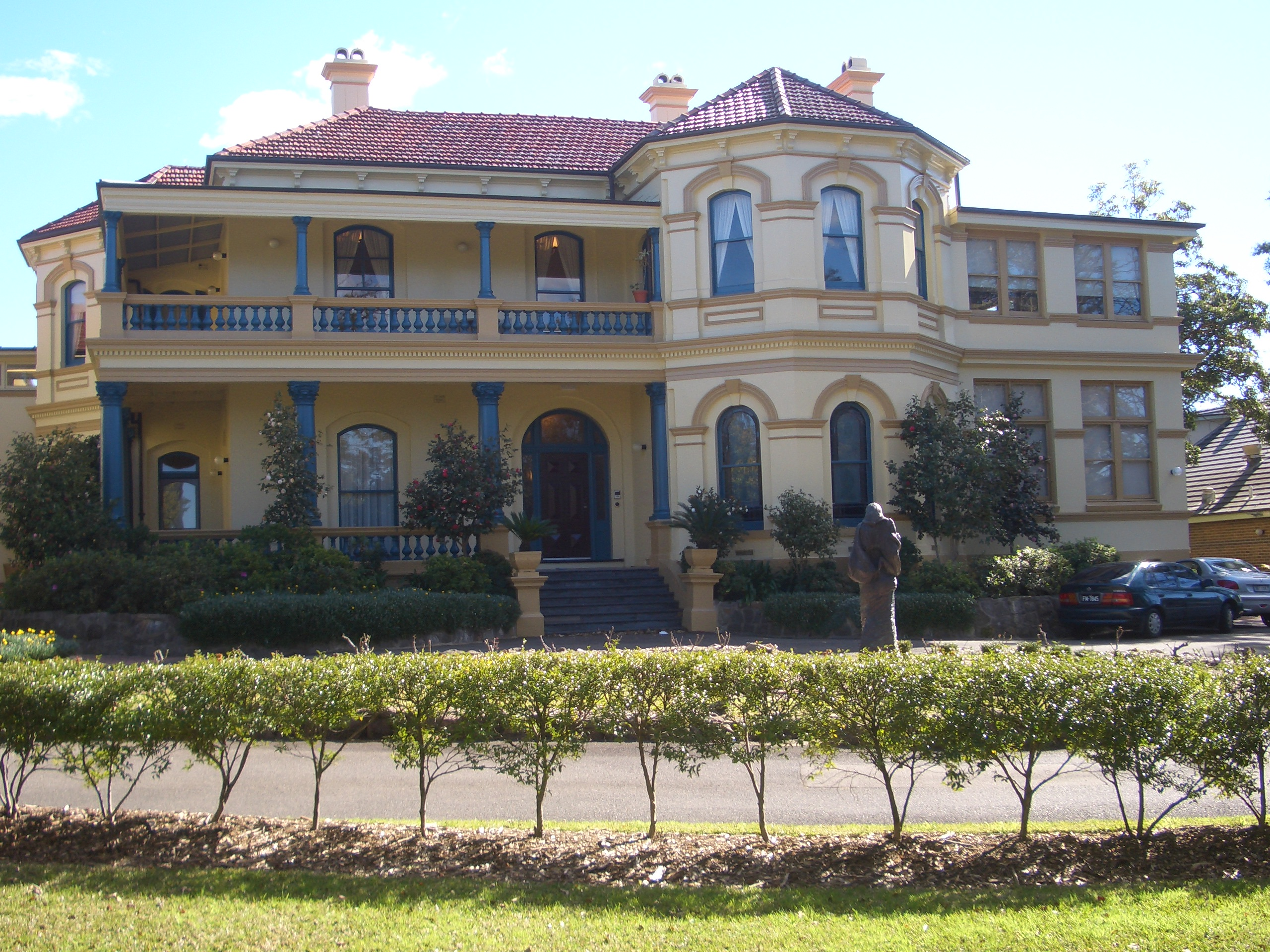
Brunyarra

== See also ==
- List of non-government schools in New South Wales
- Siena College (Camberwell)
- Catholic education in Australia
