= Suicide in Australia =

According to the Australian Bureau of Statistics, the age standardised death rate for suicide in Australia, for the year 2019, was 13.1 deaths per 100,000 people; preliminary estimates for years 2020 and 2021 are respectively 12.1 and 12.0. In 2020, 3,139 deaths were due to suicide (2,384 males and 755 females); in 2021, 3,144 deaths were due to suicide (2,358 males and 786 females). More recent data from the Australian Bureau of Statistics recorded 3,307 deaths due to suicide in 2024, with an age-standardised rate of 11.8 deaths per 100,000 people; suicide was the 16th leading cause of death and the leading cause of premature mortality that year.

The World Health Organization reported the 2019 age standardised suicide rate in Australia at 11.3 per 100,000 people per year.

Deaths from suicide occur among males at a rate three times greater than that for females: in 2019, the standardised suicide rate for males was 20.1 deaths per 100,000 people, while for females it was 6.3 deaths per 100,000 people, according to the Australian Bureau of Statistics. The Australian Institute of Health and Welfare reports similar data.

== Background information ==
In Australia, 48% of all suicides in 2000 were by 35 to 64-year-olds; an additional 13% were by 65 year olds and over. The suicide rates for children younger than 15 years is estimated to have increased by 92% between the 1960s to 1990s. Suicide rates are generally higher amongst males, rural and regional dwellers, Aboriginal and Torres Strait Islander people. Suicide prevention researcher, Gerry Georgatos has found that suicide rates among Aboriginal and Torres Strait Islander people, particularly in the Kimberley, Northern Territory and far north Queensland regions, are among the highest in the world. He describes the high rates as "a humanitarian crisis."

For a death to be considered a suicide and counted as such in Australian statistics, three criteria need to be met:

1. The death must be due to unnatural causes, such as injury, poisoning or suffocation rather than an illness
2. The actions which result in death must be self-inflicted
3. The person who injures himself or herself must have had the intention to die

(ResponseAbility, 2012)

Results from the 2020–22 National Study of Mental Health and Wellbeing indicate that:

- One in six Australians (16.7% or 3.3 million people) aged 16–85 had experienced serious thoughts about taking their own life at some point in their lives.
- Around 1.5 million or 7.4% of Australians aged 16–85 years had made a suicide plan and around 970,000 or 4.9% had attempted suicide during their lifetime.

== Helplines ==
- Beyond Blue
- Lifeline Australia
- Menslink
- Suicide Prevention Australia

== Risk factors ==
=== Gender ===
In every state and territory of Australia, suicide is much more common among males than females, with the ratio standing at 3:1 in 2012.

According to hospital data, females are more likely to deliberately injure themselves than males. In the 2008–2009 financial year, 62% of those who were hospitalised due to self-harm were female.

Researchers have attributed the difference between attempted and completed suicides among the sexes to males using more lethal means to end their lives.

Suicide rates for both males and females have generally decreased since the mid-90s with the overall suicide rate decreasing by 23% between 1999 and 2009. Suicide rates for males peaked in 1997 at 23.6 per 100,000 but have steadily decreased since then and stood at 14.9 per 100,000 in 2009. Female rates reached a high of 6.2 per 100 000 in 1997. Rates declined after that and was 4.5 per 100 000 in 2009. Comparing sex differences in suicide rates needs to consider differences across the lifespan. Since 2003, for females, suicide rates range from 4–6 suicides per 100 000 with no apparent age association, whilst for men suicide rates range from 10–30 suicides per 100 000 with substantive differences across the lifespan, with males in middle and older having substantially increased suicide rates compared to other age ranges.

=== Urban–rural differences ===
Overall suicide rates for males and females in Australia differ little between rural and urban areas. However, rates for young men are distinctly higher than women in rural settings. There are a number of different factors that contribute to this. The easy accessibility to firearms, lower socio-economic lifestyle and increased level of social isolation, all add to the higher rate of male suicide in rural Australia.

=== Alcohol ===
There is a strong correlation between alcohol (as well as other drugs) and suicide in Australian young adults. Between 30 and 50% of suicides, detectable substances are found during post-mortem coronial investigations, with alcohol being the most common.

=== Age ===
The rate of suicide in Australian adolescents has gradually decreased, yet it still remains a prominent issue. Certain groups of young adults statistically have an increased likelihood to die by suicide. Youth of Indigenous, rural or refugee backgrounds, as well as those in welfare, have been observed as having a higher likelihood of dying by suicide. Young males tend to be more at risk than females.

Since 2003, age-standardised rates of suicide have been stable for females across the life course whilst for young adult men there have been declines of between 5 and 8 deaths per 100,000 but increases of between 4 and 7 deaths per 100,000 in middle-aged men. Middle and older-aged men continue to suicide at rates 4-6 times greater than females on average, and around at rates 2–3 times greater than teenage males.

=== Unemployment ===
Studies suggest that in men there is a high correlation between the number of suicides and the length of unemployment accompanied by a decrease in the national unemployment rates. The data also states that the longer the period of low employment the higher the rate of suicides in the age group of men between ages 25–34 and 55–64.

== Statistics ==
The Australian Bureau of Statistics has kept data on suicide rates since 1981. The data collected by the ABS may underestimate the suicide rate, because people may kill themselves in such a manner that can be mistaken as an accidental death. According to the Australian Bureau of Statistics, there were 3,307 deaths due to suicide in Australia in 2024 (preliminary), with an age-standardised rate of 11.8 deaths per 100,000 people. This represents approximately one death by suicide every three hours. Suicide was the 16th leading cause of death overall and the leading cause of premature mortality, accounting for 107,327 years of potential life lost; on average, each person who died by suicide lost 34.4 years of life. Over three-quarters (76.5%) of people who died by suicide in 2024 were male. Suicide remained the leading cause of death for Australians aged 15–44 years.

== Mitigation efforts ==
In 1992, the National Health and Medical Research's Working Group was founded to examine suicide prevention in Australia.

Community media has also had a hand in raising awareness. The Community Broadcasting Association of Australia runs a national suicide prevention project that puts out a monthly set of short radio segments across community stations around the country. The segments cover things like help-seeking, mental wellbeing and lived experience, and have featured groups such as R U OK?, PANDA and ReachOut.

== List of notable cases ==
=== 20th century ===
- In 1952, politician James Vinton Smith died by suicide by firearm.
- In 1953, Nellie Cameron, a notorious Sydney prostitute in the 1920s and 1930s, died by suicide.
- In 1977, Pat Flower, an English Australian writer of plays, television plays and novels, died by suicide.
- In 1979, Christine Smith, an Australian alpine skier, died by suicide.
- In 1985, Mary Hardy, an Australian television and radio presenter, actress, writer and comedian, died by suicide.
- In 1987, Alex Carey, an Australian writer, author, social psychologist, academic and sociologist, died by suicide.
- On 3 March 1990, prominent Melbourne business man and property developer Floyd Podgornik shot himself in his inner-city apartment.
- In 1991, John Friedrich killed himself by firearm.
- In 1995, Steven Wood, an Australian sprint and marathon canoeist, died by suicide.
- In 1995, Taya Straton, an Australian actress known for her role as Rose 'Spider' Simpson in the TV show Prisoner Cell Block H, died by suicide

=== 21st century ===
- In May 2005, Rene Rivkin, Australian investor and entrepreneur died by suicide.
- In October 2005, Paul Hester, an Australian musician and television personality, died by suicide, hanging himself in Elsternwick Park near his home.
- In November 2005, Sandy Blythe, an Australian wheelchair basketball player, died by suicide.
- In 2007, a member of the Royal Australian Air Force (RAAF) from Claremont in Tasmania, Kristy Corbett, was involved in a suicide case in which her former partner took his life. Corbett was investigated for her culpability but no charges were ever laid against her.
- In November 2007, Charmaine Dragun, an Australian television newsreader, jumped off The Gap, an oceanside cliff.
- In 2008, Australian actor Mark Priestley took his own life.
- In 2009, Alex Harris, an Australian Paralympic swimmer, who represented Australia at the 2000 Summer Paralympics in Sydney and the 2004 Summer Paralympics in Athens, died by suicide.
- In 2014, Charlotte Dawson, an Australian TV presenter, died by suicide by hanging.
- In 2015, Mike Gibson, an Australian sports journalist, columnist, commentator, and radio and television presenter, died by suicide.
- In October 2016, Fergus David Edward Miller, known professionally as Bored Nothing, an Australian musician, died by suicide.
- In November 2016, Tyrone Unsworth, a 13-year-old Australian boy, died by suicide after years of bullying motivated by his homosexuality.
- In June 2017, Alice Eather, an Aboriginal Australian slam poet, environmental campaigner and teacher from Maningrida, died by suicide.
- In August 2017, Stephen Wooldridge, an Australian racing cyclist and an Olympic and four-time world champion on the track, died by suicide.
- In November 2017, Samantha Rebillet, a French-born Australian film director, actress, screenwriter, producer, singer and songwriter, died by suicide.
- In January 2018, Amy Jayne "Dolly" Everett, an Australian teenager who suffered from mental illness and who was a victim of cyberbullying, died by suicide.
- In April 2018, Shane Yarran, an Australian rules footballer, died by suicide.
- In November 2018, Jonathan Cantwell, an Australian professional road bicycle racer, died by suicide.
- In 2018, Shane Yarran, an Australian rules footballer, died by suicide.
- In 2019, Danny Frawley, an Australian rules footballer, died by suicide.
- In 2020, Shane Tuck, an Australian rules footballer, died by suicide.
- In 2021, Dieter Brummer, an Australian actor, died by suicide.
- In 2022, Paul Green, an Australian professional rugby league football coach and a professional rugby league footballer, died by suicide.
- In 2024, Cam McCarthy, an Australian rules footballer, died by suicide.
- Charlotte O'Brien, victim of school bullying.
- In 2025, Troy Selwood, an Australian rules footballer, died by suicide.
- Also in 2025, Troy's brother, Adam Selwood, an Australian rules footballer as well, died by suicide.
- In April 2025, Jeffrey Epstein's accuser, American-born Virginia Giuffre, committed suicide at her home in Australia.

== See also ==
- Health care in Australia
- Health in Australia
- Mental health in Australia
- List of Sri Lankan Tamil Asylum Seeker Suicides in Australia

== Bibliography ==
- Sveticic, Jerneja (2009). Suicide research : selected readings. Queensland: Australian Academic Press. ISBN 9781922117182.
