= Suicide of Tyrone Unsworth =

Suicide of an Australian bullying victim

Tyrone Unsworth
- Born: 16 August 2003
- Died: 22 November 2016 (aged 13); Brisbane, Queensland, Australia
- Cause of death: Suicide
- Education: Aspley State High School
- Occupation: Student

The suicide of Tyrone Unsworth (16 August 2003 – 22 November 2016) occurred on 22 November 2016, in Brisbane, Australia. Unsworth, a 13-year-old boy, died by suicide after years of bullying motivated by his homosexuality. His death garnered considerable national attention in Australia, as well as international attention.

Unsworth's suicide was particularly controversial because it took place in the context of a number of vigorous debates in Australia about LGBTI issues, notably same-sex marriage and LGBTI-specific anti-bullying programs in schools. Throughout 2016, there had been significant controversy over one such program: the Safe Schools Coalition Australia, of which the federal government had curtailed the operation. Unsworth's death renewed criticism of that decision, and was cited as evidence that the program was needed.

Criminal proceedings regarding some of the bullying Unsworth faced from his school peers continued until 2017.

== Background ==
=== Political context ===
==== Safe Schools Coalition Australia ====
In February 2016, the Safe Schools Coalition Australia, an initiative designed to combat anti-LGBTI prejudice in schools, became the center of significant political and social debate. It was criticized by conservatives prominent in both media and politics, who contended that the program was more about enforcing a radical view of sexuality and gender on school children than its stated goals. It was also criticized by socially conservative activists such as the Australian Christian Lobby, who objected to its affirmation of homosexuality and its opposition to homophobia.

On 23 February, Prime Minister Malcolm Turnbull announced that the program would be reviewed, a move heavily criticized by LGBTI advocates and Opposition Leader Bill Shorten. On 11 March the review was given to the government, and it was made public on 16 March. The review largely vindicated the program, angering conservative MPs. 43 Coalition MPs signed a petition calling for the program to be suspended. On 18 March the federal government announced that the program would be significantly curtailed. Its response went beyond that recommended by the review, which led to further criticism by LGBTI advocates.

The program continued to be the subject of controversy throughout the year. LGBTI advocates have expressed concerns that the ongoing controversy had caused an increase in anti-LGBTI school bullying.

==== Proposed plebiscite on same-sex marriage ====
On 11 August 2015, after a party room meeting of both the Liberal and National parties, the Coalition government decided that while they would continue to vote as a block against same-sex marriage for the term of Parliament of the time, it would hold a plebiscite on same-sex marriage after the next election. The proposal was almost unanimously rejected by the LGBTI community in Australia; one survey returned 85% opposition to a plebiscite among the LGBTI community. Opinion polls at the time showed a strong majority of Australians in favour of the proposal; however, some LGBTI advocates have contended that this support was not due to in-principle support for a plebiscite, but rather the loss of faith in the Parliament to legislate, and a belief that a plebiscite was necessary to legalise same-sex marriage.

After taking over the leadership of the Liberal Party and Prime Ministership in September 2015, Malcolm Turnbull pledged to continue the government's support for a plebiscite. An attempt at a conscience vote on same-sex marriage was blocked by the government on 2 March 2016.

One argument against the plebiscite offered by its opponents is that it would have a negative impact on the mental health of LGBTI people. On 22 October 2015, during Parliament's Question Time, Shorten asked Turnbull about his support for the plebiscite, citing a submission from Gay and Lesbian Health Victoria opposing the plebiscite on mental health grounds. Turnbull responded that the debate would be respectful.

The Coalition campaigned on the plebiscite at the 2016 election, pledging to hold it if re-elected. Labor pledged a parliamentary vote on same-sex marriage if it was elected, with Shorten citing the Orlando nightclub shooting as highlighting the possible dangers of a plebiscite. His comment was criticized by opponents of same-sex marriage.

The Coalition was re-elected at the 2 July election with a one-seat majority, and continued planning for the plebiscite. However, in July 2016, opinion polls began to show decreasing support for the proposal. One poll found initial support for a plebiscite to be 48%, but that when voters were aware that Coalition MPs would not be required to vote for same-sex marriage if it was passed, support dropped to 35%, and when voters were aware that it would cost $160 million, support fell to 25%.

On 12 September 2016, Shorten spoke in Parliament against a plebiscite. He again invoked mental health, but also suicide, commenting:

Every piece of expert advice tells us young Australians who are gay are more likely to contemplate suicide and more likely to take their own lives. The idea of young people, perhaps yet to come out, seeing the legitimacy of their identity debated on the national stage. That is not an ideal inflicted on any citizen when we have a better path. Let me be as blunt as possible: a 'no' campaign would be an emotional torment for gay teenagers, and if one child commits suicide over the plebiscite, then that is one too many.

This comment was strongly criticised by conservative commentators, who labelled it "emotional blackmail". However, on 4 October 2016, the Sydney Morning Herald reported that mental health service Lifeline had added "2016 Marriage Equality Plebiscite" to a list of reasons that people seek its services, in anticipation of increased demand of its services should the plebiscite go ahead.

The bill for the plebiscite was introduced to the Parliament on 14 September 2016. On 11 October the Labor caucus unanimously decided to bind against it. With Labor's numbers against it in the Senate, passage of the plebiscite bill was widely considered impossible. It passed the House on 20 October, but was voted down by the Senate on 7 November. (However, after Unsworth's death, a popular vote on same-sex marriage did take place in the form of the Australian Marriage Law Postal Survey.)

LGBTI advocates have repeatedly criticised the debate about marriage equality in Australia as vitriolic, and have argued that homophobia generated by the debate and the plebiscite contributed to Unsworth's suicide. Some have further argued that his suicide vindicates criticism of the plebiscite on the grounds it would make LGBTI suicides more likely.

=== Unsworth's personal life ===
Unsworth attended Aspley State High School in Brisbane, Australia.

His mother reported that he was gay and that he had been consistently bullied over his sexuality for years, telling the Courier-Mail, "He was a really feminine male, he loved fashion, he loved make-up and the boys always picked on him, calling him gay-boy, faggot, fairy; it was a constant thing from Year Five."

Unsworth was Indigenous.

==== Violent assault ====
On 27 October 2016, Unsworth was the victim of a violent assault, in which he was struck in the jaw with a fence pole. His aunt has reported that the assault occurred during an argument over a girl between Unsworth and another boy, narrating the argument as follows: "Someone spat on a girl so Tyrone defended the girl. The other fellow who was in the argument went and found a fence paling and while Tyrone had his back turned hit him with it."

The assault took place outside the Police Citizens Youth Club in Zillmere in north Brisbane. Students at his school witnessed the assault and took him into the club. Staff at the club called an ambulance.

Unsworth's injuries required surgery, and he was afraid to return to school following the assault. Unsworth's grandmother has reported that "We tried to force him [to return to school], but he just kept saying, 'No, I don't want to go back to school.'"

Following the assault, Unsworth moved to his grandfather's property in Upper Kedron in north west Brisbane to recover. His aunt has said that "He was very different when he got out of hospital". She and his grandfather told Unsworth after almost a month's absence from school that he would have to return to school, a prospect the Australian Broadcasting Corporation has reported "weighed heavily on Tyrone's mind."

==== Last day ====
A friend of Unsworth has reported that the day before he died by suicide, he was on a fishing trip with her and revealed the extent of the bullying he was facing. Unsworth's friend told the ABC's 7.30 program:

He was an absolute mess, crying his eyes out and telling me everyone wants him dead and I said, "Tyrone, what do you mean everyone wants you dead?" He said, "The kids at school keep telling me to go kill myself", and I was obviously gobsmacked. [The other students] did call him nasty names, like faggot and fairy. He loved girly things, he's chosen dresses for me and his mum to wear, he's asked to use makeup. Kids obviously thought because he's like that he could be a target for their bullying.

She urged Unsworth to tell someone at his school about the bullying, but that Unsworth replied "They don't care", and that he was not wanted and didn't belong at the school.

=== Actions of Aspley State High School ===
There have been conflicting reports about whether or not Unsworth's school was aware of his bullying and the actions it took.

The school has acknowledged knowing about the assault on Unsworth on 27 October but not about other bullying. Unsworth's family has disputed this.

Following Unsworth's suicide, principal Jacquita Miller said that no allegation had been made about bullying of Unsworth to the school but that the school would have intervened had there been.

Queensland's Department of Education has stated, "Tyrone was absent from school following the [assault] incident and the school attempted to make contact with the family regularly. The school has the best interests of the family and school community at heart in handling this matter."

== Death ==
Unsworth died by suicide on 22 November 2016. His grandfather had planned that he would be at school on this day, but he remained at his grandfather's farm. His grandfather returned to the farm from work at about 1 p.m. When he did not find Unsworth in the house, he "walked out the back" and found him dead.

== Reactions ==
Unsworth's suicide generated significant attention in Australia, as well as international attention.

=== Unsworth's family ===
Unsworth's mother wrote on Facebook that she "just wanted him to wake up and come home with me." She also said that Unsworth was "pain free now" and that his bullies "can't pick on you anymore, but this shouldn't of had to happen. No words can explain how we are feeling for you and what has happened."[sic]

Unsworth's grandmother wrote:

Now you're at ease and peaceful, lay to rest my beautiful grandson, you be flying high with the butterflies and your fairy angels will be guarding you way up in the sky our darling little grandson.

=== School community ===
Aspley State High School principal Jacquita Miller said in a statement that "no allegation of bullying against this young person was made to our school. Neither the student nor his family ever came to us to say there was a problem of any kind. If they did, we absolutely would have stepped in." She also said that Unsworth's family had the school's "deepest sympathies" and that "the safety and wellbeing of everyone in our school is our highest priority and we do not tolerate bullying in any way, shape or form."

A parent of children at Aspley State High petitioned the school to join the Safe Schools Coalition. The petition quickly garnered 20,000 signatures.

=== Australian community ===
Vigils were held in various locations around Australia in honour of Unsworth.

On 4 December, a rally in Unsworth's memory attended by hundreds of people was held in Brisbane. Attendees were asked to dress in bright colours. Speakers and attendees demanded implementation of the Safe Schools program in Queensland schools, with some speakers sharing stories of other LGBTI young people suffering bullying, poor mental health, and in one case, suicide.

On 5 December, the ABC featured a report on Unsworth's life, suicide and the issues of homophobia and bullying in Australia on its 7.30 program.

=== LGBTI community ===
Australia's LGBTI community reacted with shock and grief to Unsworth's suicide, and called for more to be done about anti-LGBTI bullying.

The Safe Schools Coalition released a statement saying it was "grieving the loss of a precious young life and express our deepest sympathies to the family and friends effected and ask that the public respect their right to privacy."

The New South Wales Gay and Lesbian Rights Lobby said that Unsworth's suicide was "why we need Safe Schools", and "Our thoughts are with his devastated family."

Micah Scott, the head of Australian LGBTI youth group Minus18, said that "Tyrone's experience isn't an isolated incident. It is shared by LGBTI young people around Australia. I think that is really important to highlight." He criticized what he deemed to be "fearmongering and false information" about the Safe Schools Coalition, which he said was making the program harder to implement.

LGBTI advocate Rodney Croome commented:

Being a teenager is hard enough, but being a gay teenager is that much harder because of the stigma, bullying and fear of not fitting in. (LGBTIQ youth suicide rates are) a national disgrace and it requires a national response, starting with training for all teachers in how to recognise and respond to the kind of homophobic bullying that took Tyrone Unsworth's life.

=== Political responses ===
Australian MP for Goldstein Tim Wilson used a 90-second parliamentary speech to pay tribute to Unsworth.

Opposition Leader Bill Shorten called Unsworth's suicide "heartbreaking", described him as a "brave young man", and stated that "The importance of Safe Schools has never been clearer to me."

Deputy Opposition Leader Tanya Plibersek described the news as "absolutely heartbreaking" and that "Labor's thoughts are with Tyrone's loved ones."

Senior Labor Senator Penny Wong said that "This is a tragic event and my heart goes out to Tyrone's family. This is why anti-bullying programs matter and why we need to defend the Safe Schools program."

MP for Herbert Cathy O'Toole called for the Safe Schools program to be further implemented.

Queensland Education Minister Kate Jones stated that "the heartbreaking story here is that we know young people who identify as LGBTI are more likely to commit suicide. We have to do more to support all young people to feel safe and supported. We have to work towards a day when we see an end to bullying and discrimination."

=== Response from social conservatives ===
The Australian Family Association called the news of Unsworth's suicide "horrible", while reiterating that the Safe Schools Coalition was "not about bullying."

The Australian Marriage Forum described the news as "terrible", a "tragedy" and a situation of "inconsolable sadness". They said that Unsworth had been "cruelly teased" and "everyone has been shaken" by his suicide. It maintained that his suicide was not a justification for implementing the Safe Schools program.

The Australian Christian Lobby and Marriage Alliance, another anti-same-sex marriage group, did not comment on Unsworth's suicide, according to same-sex marriage advocacy group Equal Marriage Rights Australia. EMRA criticised their lack of comment.

Fake social media accounts were set up in Unsworth's name, with the operator of one account saying that their "issue" with Unsworth is "he is a fag". Rodney Croome stated that Unsworth was "being bullied beyond the grave" and that the operation of fake accounts "highlights how deep the hatred of LGBTI people still runs in some parts of Australian society."

=== Criticism of social conservatives ===
Unsworth's suicide sparked fierce criticism of conservative activists who had campaigned against LGBTI anti-bullying initiatives such as the Safe Schools Coalition.

LGBTI rights activist Simon Hunt argued that "The Australian Christian Lobby and The Australian are culpable in Tyrone's death because of their relentless, dishonest campaign against #SafeSchools."

Lobbying group Secular Public Education severely criticised the Australian Christian Lobby, calling it "viciously homophobic" and accusing it of "intense hate-campaigning", "malicious actions and bullying tactics". SPE alleged that the controversy over Safe Schools had been "entirely fabricated" by the ACL, which was "relentlessly assisted" by News Limited, and that as a result of their campaigning, "Queensland schools running the program are subjected to a constant stream of abusive correspondence, emails and phone calls."

Equal Marriage Rights Australia asserted that the Australian Christian Lobby and other conservative activists had "so much blood on its hands" due to Unsworth's suicide.

Daily Telegraph contributor Shannon Molloy wrote that "there are a lot of people with the innocent blood of a 13-year-old boy on their hands this week" and wondered "if they're happy about it." He accused some conservative activists of "devoting significant portions of their lives to attacking, persecuting, degrading and seeking the continued marginalisation of gay, lesbian and transgender people" and said he "wouldn't be surprised if inside their cold, dead hearts there's a rare and excited beat" over Unsworth's death.

Contributor for The Guardian Nic Holas wrote that anger over the death "is best directed" towards "architects" of the campaign against the Safe Schools Coalition. He identified those architects as "the editors and staff of conservative newspapers; the rightwing politicians like Queensland's own George Christensen, who continues to attack any and every aspect of the Safe Schools program and had the temerity to gloat after he successfully "gutted" the anti-bullying program; the Australian Christian Lobby who target LGBTIQA children and illegally use their images to spread a deceitful campaign." Holas attributed Unsworth's bullying to "a culture of conservatism gone mad".

Fairfax Media writer John Birmingham wrote that Unsworth's suicide was an example of "the real-world consequences of the cruel games played by politicians like George Christensen and Cory Bernardi, and the cowardice of Malcolm Turnbull". He accused the trio of believing it to be "so important [Unsworth] and every child like him be made to feel like hunted freaks."

Fellow Fairfax writer Tim Dick condemned "grown-up bullies, those adults who attack, smear, vilify the people who drew up an optional educational tool to reduce the amount of hate people have to face."

The Labor politician Cathy O'Toole said that the federal government had made "incredibly cruel and divisive remarks" about the program.

Courier Mail contributor Lauren Martyn-Jones wrote that "Tyrone Unsworth is just the sort of kid the Safe Schools program was established to support, before it became mired in controversy and ended up as a whipping post for the right-wing, anti-PC brigade."

The Salvation Army was criticised for issuing a statement shortly after Unsworth's death saying that it would not support the Safe Schools Coalition in its current form.

Michael Barnett, co-convenor of Jewish LGBTI group Aleph, commented that "News Corp journalists like Andrew Bolt, Miranda Devine and Rita Panahi are on a crusade to destroy transgender kids", a claim strongly denied and criticised by Bolt.

== Memorial ==
Unsworth's funeral was on 1 December 2016. Over $20,000 was raised by his family to cover the costs of the funeral.

== Aftermath ==
=== Criminal proceedings ===
The assault on Unsworth was investigated by Queensland Police. On 3 February 2017, the police force concluded their investigation and said in a statement that Unsworth's assailant, also a 13-year-old boy, was "being dealt with under the provisions of the Youth Justice Act".

=== Future of the Safe Schools Coalition ===
Federal government funding for the Safe Schools Coalition was set to expire on 30 June 2017. In order for the program to continue operation after this date, it would be necessary for it to be funded by states. Australian states have taken different approaches to funding of the program.

On 16 April 2017, New South Wales Education Minister Rob Stokes announced that New South Wales would not fund the program beyond 30 June 2017, and that it would be replaced by a different anti-bullying initiative. This move was heavily criticised by Fairfax columnist Andrew Street, who invoked Unsworth's suicide in his criticism.

On 18 April 2017, Tasmanian Education Minister Jeremy Rockliff announced that, like New South Wales, Tasmania would also not fund the program beyond 30 June 2017, and would instead implement a different anti-bullying initiative. The new initiative would preserve a focus on anti-LGBTI bullying. The Australian Christian Lobby criticised the new program as well, arguing that there should be no focus on sexuality and gender in anti-bullying programs.

== See also ==
- LGBT rights in Australia
- List of LGBT-related suicides
- List of suicides that have been attributed to bullying
- Safe Schools Coalition Australia
- School bullying
- Suicide among LGBT youth
- Suicide in Australia
- Transgender rights in Australia
