= R U OK? =

Australian mental health organisation

- Frequency: Annually
- Inaugurated: 29 November 2009
- Founder: Gavin Larkin
- Previous event: 10 September 2026
- Next event: 9 September 2027
- Website: www.ruok.org.au

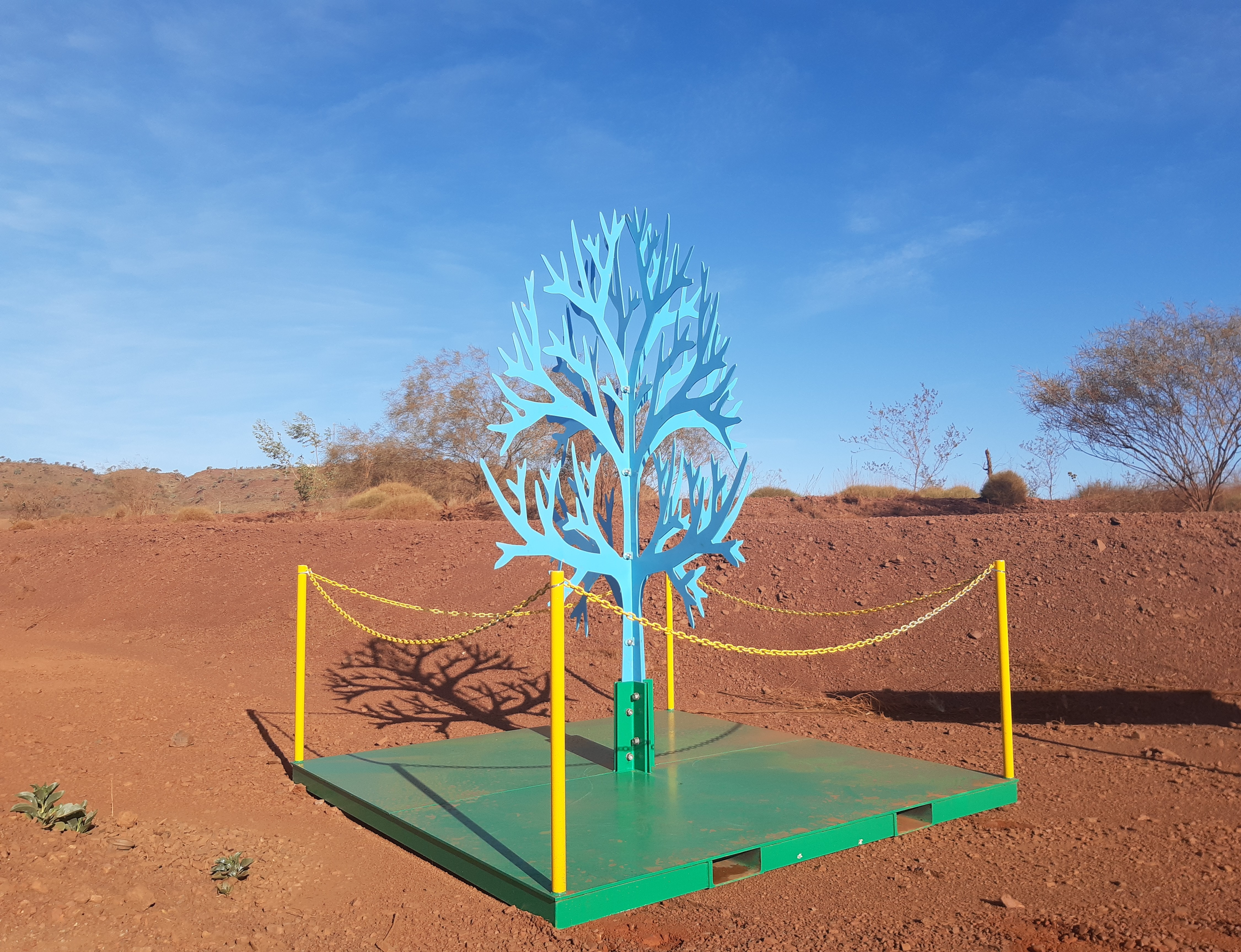
Blue Tree promoting mental health at the Brockman 4 mine, Western Australia by R U OK?

R U OK? is an Australian non-profit suicide prevention organisation, founded by advertiser Gavin Larkin in 2009. It revolves around the slogan "R U OK?" (gramogram for "are you okay?") and advocates for people to have conversations with others. The organisation holds a dedicated R U OK? Day annually on the second Thursday of September, which encourages Australians to connect with people who have emotional insecurity, to address social isolation and promote community cohesiveness.

R U OK? works collaboratively with experts in suicide prevention and mental illness, as well as government departments, corporate leaders, teachers, universities, students and community groups. Its activities also align with the Australian Government's LIFE Framework.

R U OK? Limited is on the Register of Harm Prevention Charities. The organisation has corporate sponsors, ambassadors and government funding. The Australian Department of Health granted R U OK? funds of $824,945 for suicide prevention campaigns and web resources (effective July 2019 to June 2021).

== Background ==
In a 12-month period, it is estimated that 65,000 Australians make a suicide attempt, with an average of 2,320 people dying by suicide every year. The 2007 National Survey of Mental Health and Wellbeing of adults estimated that around 45% of the Australian population in the 16–85 age bracket will experience mental illness in their lifetime, while 20% of the population experience a common mental disorder in the previous 12 months.

== History ==
Gavin Larkin's father, Barry Larkin, died by suicide in 1996. Later, when Gavin Larkin experienced depression and was concerned about his mental health, he completed a course at Landmark Worldwide. From this course, he chose to complete a project about suicide prevention to honour his father, to create a National Day of Action about contacting people who might be having a difficult time. This resulted in the eventual co-creation with Janina Nearn of R U OK? in 2009. The first day was held on 29 November 2009, but the annual timing later changed to be on the second Thursday of September.

The R U OK? slogan was established from extensive research proving that communication with people positively impacts their mental state. The message for the first R U OK? Day was "a conversation can change a life". On the R U OK? website Larkin has said that, "Getting connected and staying connected is the best thing anyone can do for themselves and for those who may be at risk."

Since its inception, many Australian celebrities, community leaders and athletes such as Hugh Jackman; Naomi Watts; Simon Baker; former South Sydney Rabbitohs co-captain, Roy Asotasi; former professional rugby league footballer Wendell Sailor, gold medal Olympian Libby Trickett and community leader Deepak Vinayak have enlisted as ambassadors and supporters in order to raise awareness.

In 2009, Yahoo!7's Sunrise reported that 650,000 conversations took place as a result of the campaign.

Founder Gavin Larkin died from lymphoma in 2011, but his family have continued to promote the campaign.

In 2012, the annual Don Ritchie Suicide Prevention Award was announced in conjunction with R U OK? Day to recognise the "extraordinary acts of service and commitment to suicide prevention," said NSW Minister for Mental Health, Kevin Humphries. After his death, Don Ritchie, the 'Angel of the Gap', was recognised for his "efforts in saving the lives of hundreds of people at risk of suicide" with the award continuing to recognise the efforts of others in this field. The 2013 organisational category of the award was won by R U OK?.

A study on the effectiveness of the 2014 R U OK? Day campaign found that the broader population were aware of the day and that it had a positive impact.

In 2017, R U OK? Day was featured on Australian Story.

After complaints about the 2019 R U OK? signage in Woolgoolga, the Chamber of Commerce decided to remove large letters spelling out the slogan, which had been installed along public roads. The complaints stated that it inaccurately portrayed the town as being "...full of people with a mental illness...", disregarding the message of the campaign. The vice president of the Woolgoolga Chamber of Commerce, R U OK ambassador Lisa Nichols, was hurt by the complaints given the nature of the day. The Woolgoolga community and Nichols had received that year's Barbara Hocking Memorial Award: Community category for their R U OK "Woopi Wears Yellow" promotions.

R U OK? has collaborated with transport companies to host a separately-timed industry-specific Rail R U OK? Day in April each year. Train drivers and other rail workers are provided with trauma support options including the RailRes app.

=== Reception and impact ===
R U OK? Day has been subject to criticism that while it is well-meaning, it has a superficial and simplistic focus of informal health promotion through encouraging professional referrals. Referrals are also suggested without acknowledgement of service wait times, service costs and the complexities of managing mental health. The day has also been reviewed as being promoted in a tokenistic way, despite the organisation's recommended guidelines of suggesting ongoing support to others. There are possible harmful impacts from people starting conversations for which they are ill-equipped or uninformed, with triggering language. There has also been a call for increased insight, diagnosis, treatment and monitoring to acknowledge mental health's slow onset and cyclical nature, rather than an annual day.

R U OK?'s own reporting into their impact and media sentiment analysis has been criticised for its low sample size and partial capture of experiences around the day.

== See also ==
- Suicide in Australia
