= Rahni Sadler =

Australian television reporter

- Education: B.A.
- Alma mater: Sydney University
- Occupation: Broadcast journalist
- Spouse: Trent Miller (divorced)

Rahni Sadler (Sydney, born on 24 June 1972), is an Australian television reporter.

== Career ==
Sadler first worked in media as a teen model for Chadwick Model Management. Her career focus though, was journalism. After doing work experience in radio, TV and at magazines, Rahni secured her first reporting job at WIN TV, the Nine Network's affiliate in Canberra.

In mid-2000 she accepted a position at Seven's Sydney newsroom. In 2003 she switched to Network Ten where she became a correspondent at the Los Angeles bureau. The Seven Network lured her back in February 2007, although this time in at Los Angeles bureau.

In 2010, she returned to Australia after more than seven years as a correspondent in the U.S. and took up a position as senior reporter for the Seven Network's Sunday Night program. She was also a fill-in presenter on Weekend Sunrise.

In April 2017, Sadler resigned from a full-time position at the Seven Network but continued to work with the network on a freelance basis.

Sadler joined the Australian Broadcasting Corporation in August 2024 as a senior producer on 7.30, remaining with the program until March 2026. In March 2026, the Seven Network announced that she would return to the network as executive producer of Seven News Spotlight.

== Personal life ==
Rahni attended Santa Sabina College in the Sydney suburb of Strathfield, a day school for girls. She completed a Bachelor of Arts degree at Sydney University, participating in the honours program in the Political Science (Government) Department.

She has one child, born in 2018.

Preceded by Deborah Knight	Ten News; US correspondent 2003 - 2007	Succeeded by Nicole Strahan
