= Anne Philomena O'Brien =

Australian historian

- Born: 1954 (age 71–72); Glenelg, South Australia, Australia
- Occupation: Historian
- Notable work: God's Willing Workers

Anne Philomena O'Brien (born 1954) is an Australian historian and author who is a professor of history at the University of New South Wales.

== Early life and education ==
Anne Philomena O'Brien was born in 1954 in Glenelg, South Australia, Australia. Her parents were Paul and Mary (Mollie) O'Brien. Anne was their fifth and youngest daughter. O'Brien was educated at Dominican Convent Cabra in Adelaide.

In 1975, O'Brien earned a Bachelor of Arts in history from the University of Adelaide, graduating with honours. She taught part-time for a year at Flinders University in South Australia, before enrolling in a PhD program at the University of Sydney. She completed her PhD in 1982.

== Career ==
From 1982 to 1985, she taught at Santa Sabina College.

In 1987, O'Brien began lecturing in history at the University of New South Wales. She became an associate professor in 2007, and later became a full professor in the School of Humanities and Languages.

== Books ==
In 1988, O'Brien published her first book, Poverty's Prison. The Poor in New South Wales 1880–1918, which was based on her PhD research. Her second book, God's Willing Workers: Women and Religion in Australia, was published in 2005. She published Philanthropy and Settler Colonialism in 2014. O'Brien is married and has two children.
