= Exsul Familia =

Apostolic constitution by Pope Pius XII

Exsul Familia Latin for 'The émigré Family' Apostolic constitution of Pope Pius XII
- Signature date: 1 August 1952
- Subject: Immigration
- Text: In Latin; In English

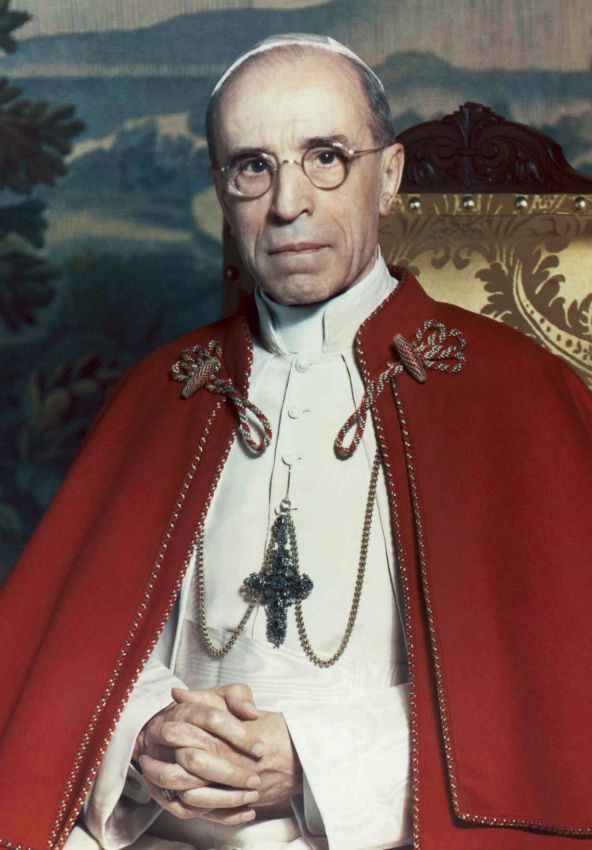
Pope Pius XII, c. 1951

Exsul Familia (The émigré Family) is an apostolic constitution of Pope Pius XII on the topic of migration. It was released on 1 August 1952. The title of the document refers to the Holy Family, forced to flee into Egypt, taken as the archetype of every refugee family. Drawing upon Pope Leo XIII's Rerum Novarum, Exsul Familia presents emigration as a natural right.

It has been called "the Church's Magna Carta for Migrants".

== Background ==
A statistical report from the Council of Europe of that time documents the extent of the problem. In 1950, five years after the end of WWII, there were 11.8 million displaced persons in Europe, of which 1.23 million persons were foreign nationals. This figure has been slightly decreasing since May 1945. Austria and Finland are not included. They add another 801 000 displaced persons. A total of 12.6 million persons lived displaced as refugees in various West European countries.

== Content ==
Exsul Familia concerns the pastoral care of millions of displaced persons seeking refuge after World War Two in Europe. Pope Pius XII reaffirms the church's commitment to caring for pilgrims, aliens, exiles, and migrants, affirming that all people have the right to migrate to achieve a life worthy of human dignity.

The Pontiff views the émigré Holy Family of Nazareth, fleeing into Egypt, as "the models and protectors of every migrant, alien and refugee of whatever kind who, whether compelled by fear of persecution or by want, is forced to leave his native land, his beloved parents and relatives, his close friends, and to seek a foreign soil."

Pius XII makes three theological points. Pope Leo XIII said that people have a right to migrate to sustain their lives and the lives of their families. Jesus shares the same trials as those forced to leave home; and creation is a gift from God to be shared by all.

Pius XII recalled that Ambrose of Milan, after ransoming the captives taken after the defeat of the Emperor Valens at the Battle of Adrianople, sacrificed the sacred vessels in order to relieve the destitute from physical suffering. Pius mentioned religious orders founded specifically to ransom captives as well as missioners who devoted their efforts to assist enslaved people. He also made reference to devout associations that established hospices and hospitals extending hospitality to pilgrims and other strangers. He also cited the efforts of Pope Pius VI and Pope Pius VII to provide a safe haven for French émigrés fleeing revolution and war.

== History ==
Pius XII presented a historical summary of the contributions of the Catholic Church towards migration.

The Fourth Council of the Lateran affirmed that experience proves that the sacred ministry is carried on more effectively among strangers and pilgrims if it is exercised by priests of their own nationality or at least who speak their language. He observed that national parishes had been established for the various languages and ethnic groups. He noted both the missionaries that emigrated to serve new arrivals and the bishops and priests who helped them assimilate into a new culture. Special mention was made of Vincent Pallotti, who established St Peter's Church in Holborn to serve the Italian immigrants in London. Similarly, John Baptist Scalabrini, Bishop of Piacenza, founded "an institute of priests ready and willing to leave their native land for remote places, particularly, for America, where they could carry on the priestly ministry among the numerous Italian Catholics, who were forced by economic distress to emigrate and to take up residence in foreign lands." Because of her extraordinary devotion and outstanding work for Italian emigrants, Frances Xavier Cabrini was rightly called the “Mother of Italian Emigrants.” In 1910, in response to a request by Msgr. Luigi Pozzi, pastor of St. Joachim's parish, in South Trenton, New Jersey for sisters to work among his Italian parishioners, Pope Pius X sent five sisters of the Religious Teachers Filippini to America.

Pope Leo XIII upheld the dignity and rights of the working man and defended those emigrants who sought to earn their living abroad. In 1878, the Bishops of Germany established the Society of St. Raphael to aid emigrants, including those from Belgium, Austria and Italy. During World War I, Pope Benedict XV directed that the bishop of the dioceses in which prisoners of war were held should without delay appoint priests, sufficiently familiar with the language of the prisoners, to provide for their care. In 1919, the Italo-Albanese Eparchy of Lungro was created for Catholics of the Byzantine Rite who had emigrated, mostly from Epirus and Albania, to Sicily and Calabria. In 1920, the National Catholic Welfare Council established a Bureau of Immigration to assist immigrants in getting established in the United States. In 1922, Pope Pius XI housed sick and orphaned Armenian children at Castel Gandolfo at his own expense. In 1928 Sant'Antonio Abate all'Esquilino and its surroundings were acquired by the Holy See, which assigned the church to Russian Catholics of the Byzantine Rite. He also separated the Byzantine parishes from the dioceses of Palermo and Monreale, forming the new Eparchy of Piana. In 1922, he granted that official Papal approval to the Apostleship of the Sea for its work for the spiritual welfare of sailors. The Catholic Near East Welfare Association (CNEWA) was established in 1926 by American bishops to provide pastoral and humanitarian support to Northeast Africa, the Middle East, Eastern Europe, and India. The Society of Christ was founded in the archdiocese of Gniezno in 1932 for the spiritual care of Poles living abroad.

== During and after World War II ==
No matter how enormous the difficulties that faced us and how impossible the times, we left nothing untried to bring some aid to our suffering sons, without discrimination as to their status or nationality. We also exerted great efforts for the displaced Jews who were victims of the cruelest persecutions. We approved, initiated, and furthered many works of charity for the relief of countless untold wartime disasters and hardships [...] But in all these works of charity, we were especially solicitous for prisoners of war, refugees, exiles and our other sons who, for whatever reason, had to wander far from their homelands. And along with these, our chief concerns were children and orphans. Yet this being well known to all, since the record is amply documented, there is no need to recount it further.

An office was established for inquiring about and exchanging information on prisoners and was maintained through the war. Buildings at the Vatican as well as at the Lateran, and especially those at Castel Gandolfo; and at the Roman Basilicas, as well as these religious communities, seminaries and ecclesiastical colleges of Rome sheltered displaced persons.

"It was also our privilege to bring comfort to millions of soldiers and prisoners by means of religious and charitable undertakings; [...] to obtain freedom for civilians condemned unjustly to prison or exile; [...] and to provide for the burial of those fallen in battle, to guard their revered remains and to return them to their homelands.

In 1949, in the aftermath of the 1948 Arab–Israeli War, the Pontifical Mission for Palestine was formed to focus relief efforts in Palestine, under the administration of CNEWA. The International Catholic Migration Commission was established in 1951 to coordinate the response of Catholic organizations to the needs of migrants and refugees.

"We have tried earnestly to produce in the minds of all people a sympathetic approach towards exiles and refugees who are our needier brothers [...] This we have done in radio addresses, in talks and discourses given as occasion arose, and in letters to archbishops and bishops." In a letter of December 24, 1948 to the American Bishops, Pius wrote:

The natural law itself, no less than devotion to humanity, urges that ways of migration be opened to these people. For the Creator of the universe made all good things primarily for the good of all...the sovereignty of the State, although it must be respected, cannot be exaggerated to the point that access to this land is, for inadequate or unjustified reasons, denied to needy and decent people from other nations, provided of course, that the public wealth, considered very carefully, does not forbid this.

In a Christmas Address of 1948, Pius said, "It is better [...] to facilitate the migration of families into those countries able to provide them with the essentials of life, than to send foodstuffs at great expense to refugee camps." On June 1, 1951, in a radio address on the fiftieth anniversary of the Encyclical Rerum Novarum, Pius spoke on the right of people to migrate.

According to the teaching of “Rerum Novarum,” —the right of the family to a living space is recognized...the thickly inhabited countries will be relieved and their people will acquire new friends in foreign countries; and the States which receive the emigrants will acquire industrious citizens [...] In this way, the nations which give and those which receive will both contribute to the increased welfare of man and the progress of human culture.

He then listed a number of relief and welfare projects that had been carried out: institutes to care for orphans and children crippled in the war; kitchens and tables with food for the needy; shelters for receiving newly released prisoners and refugees on their return to their homeland; Christmas presents given to children and prisoners; trips through various European nations to bring aid, food, clothing, medicine for the poor and victims of the war; recreation centers for soldiers far from home.

== Guidelines ==
The Pope explains that many bishops throughout the world have asked the holy see, to issue guidelines for the pastoral care of those who emigrated to their shores. The second part of Exsul Familia contains these guidelines:

- It first discusses the relocation of clergy and religious. Jurisdiction is under the Consistorial Congregation, subject to consultation with the Congregation for the Oriental Churches and the Propaganda Fide.
- The functions of the Visitors or Delegates of various languages or nationalities, previously established for the religious welfare of immigrants and refugees living in Europe and America was ended; as was the Office of Prelate for Italian Emigrants in favor of the Office of Delegate for Migration Affairs in the Consistorial Congregation.
- The Office of Delegate for Migration Affairs oversees Directors, who in turn supervise missionaries to migrants and ship chaplains. Nonetheless, directors, missionaries, and chaplains remain under the authority of their Ordinaries.
- The diocesan bishop has the leading responsibility for the pastoral care of migrants. Assistance should be provided by priests of the same nationality as the immigrants, or who speak the same language; they must also be properly trained and work under the authority of the local Ordinary; local pastors must show the same concern for immigrants that is required of them in their ordinary pastoral duties.
- A Day for Migrants should be celebrated on the first Sunday in Advent.

== See also ==
- Catholic social teaching
