= International Catholic Migration Commission =

International non-governmental organization

- Formation: 1951
- Type: International non-governmental organization
- Purpose: Humanitarian assistance, refugee resettlement
- Headquarters: Geneva (Switzerland)
- Secretary General: Davide Bernocchi (2024-present)
- President: Christine Nathan (2022-present)
- Website: www.icmc.net

The International Catholic Migration Commission (ICMC) is an international organization that serves and protects uprooted people, including migrants, refugees, and internally displaced people, regardless of faith, race, ethnicity or nationality. With staff and programs in over 40 countries, ICMC advocates for sustainable solutions and rights-based policies directly and through a worldwide network of 132 member organizations.

ICMC's expertise and core programming consists of refugee resettlement, humanitarian assistance and prevention (shelter, health, non-food items, cash assistance, disaster risk reduction, assistance and prevention for victims of sexual and gender-based violence, anti-trafficking), advocacy on migration and development.

ICMC has ECOSOC consultative status since 1952 and was granted public juridical status by the Holy See in 2008. In 2011, ICMC has been selected as the coordinator of the Civil Society network of the Global Forum on Development and Migration, which in 2015 brought together over 500 government delegates from more than 140 countries, 300 leaders of civil society worldwide and high-level delegates from UN and international agencies to discuss the relation between migration and development, share experiences and forge practical cooperation.

== Early years ==
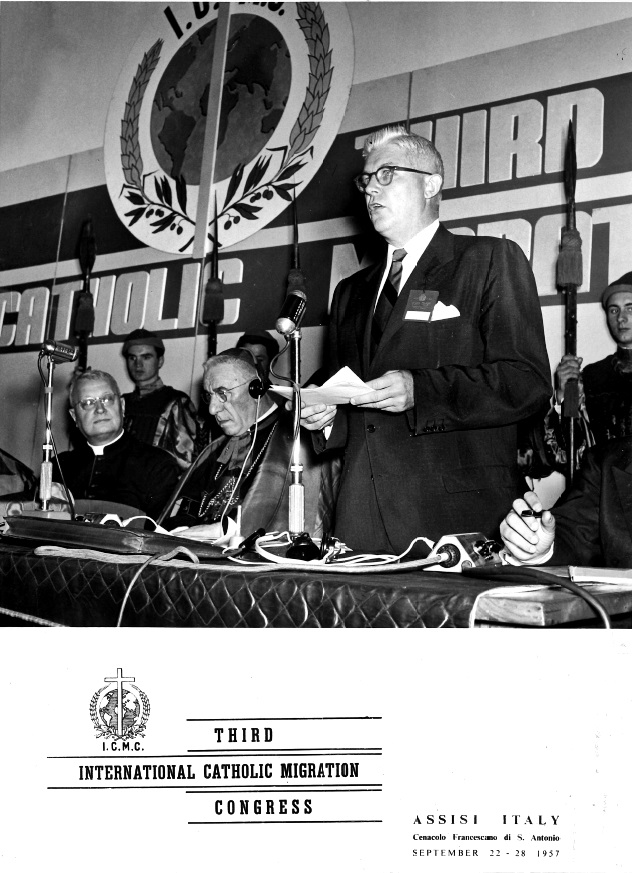
Third ICMC Congress in Assisi (Italy), 1957

The founding of ICMC followed the end of the Second World War and the great displacement of peoples caused by the international conflict. By 1949, in Eastern Europe thousands were forced to flee their homes and seek refuge in the Western countries: it soon became clear to the Holy See in Rome that a systematic effort was needed on the part of Catholic organizations to respond to the needs of these migrants.

In 1951, German, Italian, and American laity and clergy – most notably Pope Pius XII, the Secretary of State Archbishop Giovanni Battista Montini (the future Pope Paul VI), Mr. James J. Norris and Cardinal Josef Frings – initiated the International Catholic Migration Commission (ICMC). The following year, Pope Pius XII formally established ICMC through a papal letter, Exsul Familia, which brought worldwide attention towards the needs of migrants and invoked the support of the Catholics to welcome and assist foreign nationals fleeing their home countries.

In its early years, the work of ICMC focused on the administration of migrant travel loan funds. ICMC soon gained comprehensive expertise in assisting the migrants and increased its network of member organizations and local partners, thus becoming a worldwide movement.

== 1960s and 1970s ==
ICMC kept growing in the 1960s, expanding its activities through offices in Brazil, Venezuela, Colombia, Argentina and Chile. By the early 1970s, the migration phenomenon had become more complex and international: the end of the war in Vietnam, the attempted genocide in Cambodia and violent events elsewhere caused massive and unprecedented migration flows. ICMC continued to assist European refugees relocate in new countries, while also starting new programs in South and Southeast Asia, the Near East, Africa and Latin America.

In 1979, while thousands of "boat people" fleeing Vietnam were perishing at sea, ICMC played a key role in the UNHCR Orderly Departure Program (ODP), while also providing legal and safe means of emigration for those Vietnamese migrants (mainly through resettlement in the United States).

In 1975, James Norris – one of the ICMC founders, who had by then been President of the organization for over 20 years – won the UNHCR Nansen Refugee Award. the highest UNHCR recognition for "extraordinary service to the forcibly displaced".

== 1980s and 1990s ==
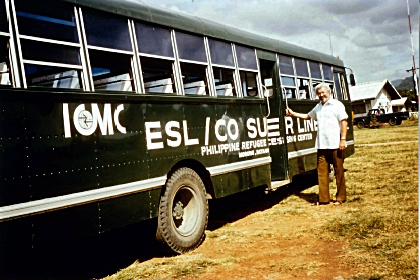
ICMC Philippines program, 1985

ICMC continued its operations in the Soviet Union during the 1980s, assisting Eastern European refugees resettle in Western countries. In the 1990s, ICMC played a lead role during the war in Yugoslavia: the ICMC office in Zagreb (Croatia), opened in 1993, processed thousands of resettlement applications – mainly by Bosnian Muslims seeking support to emigrate towards the United States. In 1997, ICMC initiated three micro-credit institutions (in Serbia-Montenegro and Kosovo) providing business loans, training and counselling to the uprooted people wishing to start a new life after the conflict.

In 1998, ICMC initiated a close partnership with UNHCR through the ICMC-UNHCR Resettlement Deployment Scheme, a roster of skilled resettlement experts, managed by ICMC, who play a key role in identifying and assessing the eligibility for resettlement of the most vulnerable refugees. In 2015, the Scheme deployed a total of 189 experts to 78 UNHCR field offices in 39 countries; ICMC deployees submitted 33,656 Syrian refugees for resettlement.

In the late 1990s, ICMC started a closer collaboration with African organizations (including the Organization of African Unity and Caritas Congo), thanks to which new programs begun in Guinea and Burundi. ICMC was also present in East Timor in 1999, when severe turmoil followed its declaration of independence from Indonesia.

== From the 2000s to nowadays ==
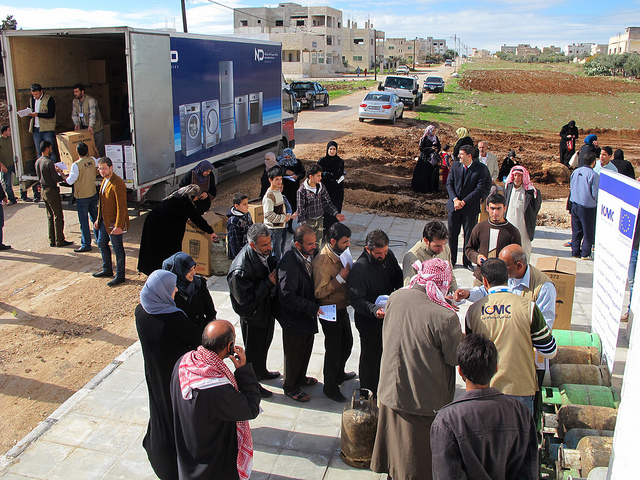
ICMC distributes relief items in Jordan, 2012.

2001 saw the beginning of war in Afghanistan. With large numbers of Afghan refugees soon able to return home after many years in neighboring countries, ICMC took immediate action and started in Afghanistan its largest-ever operation assistance: over 70,000 people returning from Pakistan and Iran were sheltered in camps.

In 2004, when the tsunami hit the Indonesian coasts, ICMC rushed to respond to what was to become one of the worst natural disasters in recent history. ICMC was already present in the Aceh region at the time and was therefore able to respond immediately to the devastation caused.

Political instability in the Middle East since the beginning of 2011 – notably the Syrian civil war – has caused mass displacements in the region. ICMC, active in the Greater Damascus area since 2006, started a number of projects focusing on Iraqi refugees settled in Syria, displaced people fleeing the conflict into Jordan and vulnerable people within the host Jordanian communities. The projects are implemented with the collaboration of ICMC's long-term local partner, Terre des Hommes Syria.

A resettlement partner of the U.S. Department of State's Bureau of Population, Refugees, and Migration (BPRM) since the 1980s, ICMC operates a Resettlement Support Center (RSC) in Istanbul, Turkey, which refers eligible refugees to the U.S. Department of Homeland Security for consideration. In the last few years alone, the RSC has facilitated the resettlement of more than 37,000 eligible refugees from countries of first asylum.

In 2014, ICMC initiated a large public-private partnership program (known as "ICMC Cares") to protect labor migrants in Eastern Europe. The partnership includes the collaboration with public administrations, employment services, academic institutes, and private hospitals in Eastern Europe, and aims to expand to other European countries.

Headquartered in Geneva, Switzerland, ICMC has affiliated entities in Brussels, Belgium (ICMC Europe), Washington, D.C., and Boston, U.S. (ICMC Inc.), as well as operational offices in Greece, Lebanon, Jordan, Turkey, Malaysia, and Pakistan.

== See also ==
- George Crennan, Director of the Federal Catholic Immigration Office in Australia from 1949 until 1995
- Anne Gallagher, President of the International Catholic Migration Commission (2018–2022)
- Robert J. Vitillo, Secretary General of the International Catholic Migration Commission (2016-2024)
