= Robert J. Vitillo =

Secretary General of International Catholic Migration Commission

- Occupation: Secretary general at International Catholic Migration Commission

Robert Joseph Vitillo (born 1946 in New Jersey) is Senior Advisor to the Vatican's Dicastery for Promoting Integral Human Development. He was previously the Secretary General of the International Catholic Migration Commission (ICMC). Prior to that, Vitillo served in various high level functions in Catholic charitable agencies, including Caritas Internationalis and the Catholic Campaign for Human Development. A trained social worker, he is known for his broad expertise on human migration and refugee services, child protection, social services, human rights, HIV/AIDS and global health.

== Early years and education ==
Born in New Jersey (United States of America) in 1946, Vitillo completed undergraduate studies at Marquette University (Milwaukee, Wisconsin) and then pursued graduate studies in theology and psychology at Catholic University of America (Washington D.C.). In 1976, he received a Master of Social Work degree from Rutgers University, New Jersey, with concentrations in clinical social work and management.

== Career ==
During the 1980s, Vitillo served as Director of the multi-service Catholic Charities agency in the Diocese of Paterson, New Jersey, where he also coordinated the resettlement of Southeast Asian, Ethiopian, Eritrean, Haitian and Cuban refugees to the United States. Between 1986 and 1995, Vitillo held different positions with Caritas Internationalis, the Vatican-based Confederation of 165 national Catholic humanitarian assistance, social and health service, and development programs in all regions of the world. There he first served as Head of Service for North America and Europe; during that time, he helped to establish many new Caritas organizations in Eastern and Central Europe. He later served as Director of Programs and then as International Delegate to the United Nations Headquarters in New York and to the World Bank in Washington, D.C..

From 1997 to 2005, he was executive director of the Catholic Campaign for Human Development of the United States Conference of Catholic Bishops, the largest private funding source for organizations working to eradicate poverty and social injustice in the USA

Between 2005 and 2016, Vitillo had also served as Head of the Caritas Internationalis Delegation to the UN in Geneva and as its Special Advisor on Health and HIV/AIDS.

In June 2016, Vitillo was appointed as Secretary General of the International Catholic Migration Commission (ICMC), an international Catholic Church-inspired and non-governmental organization working in the area of migration and refugee assistance. Founded in 1951, in the wake of the massive human displacement caused by the Second World War, ICMC provides assistance and protection to uprooted people in more than 50 countries worldwide. The organization was granted public juridical status by the Holy See in 2008.

During his career, Vitillo has taken up various special assignments. In 1980, he helped to design the ICMC Cultural Orientation Program for Southeast Asian refugees being processed in Bataan, Philippines, for eventual resettlement in USA and other countries. He provided technical and pastoral advice to several organizations on appropriate church-based responses to HIV and facilitated training programs in child welfare, adoption services, and outreach education programs on HIV/ AIDS. He is also the author of a number of publications on human rights, HIV/AIDS and global health, migration and refugee resettlement, child welfare, and social services.

== Publications ==
Books

- The Pandemic of AIDS: A Response by the Confederation of Caritas Internationalis ed. by R. Vitillo. Rome, Italy: Caritas Internationalis (1988)
- Caritas Training Manual on HIV/AIDS by R. Vitillo and M. O'Donohue, Nairobi, Kenya: Paulines Publications Africa (1997)
- Training Manual and Resource Guide for HIV/AIDS Trainers/Service Providers by Robert J. Vitillo, ACSW and Mimi Blum, MPH(c). The University of Texas AIDS Regional Education and Training Center (Houston) and Catholic Charities USA (1997)
- Curriculum d’Instruction en Education Sur la Vie, la Famille, la Sexualité pour les Ecoles Secondaires Catholiques de Haiti co-published by Caritas Haiti, Commission Episcopale pour l’Education Catholique (CEEC), USAID, Health Communication Partnership, Office of the United States Global AIDS Coordinator (2006)
- A Faith-Based Response to HIV in Southern Africa: The Choose to Care Initiative, Best Practice Collection ed. by R. Vitillo. Rome, Italy: Caritas Internationalis (2006)
- Pastoral Training for Responding to HIV-AIDS ed. by R. Vitillo. Rome, Italy: Caritas Internationalis, Nairobi: Paulines Publications Africa (2007)
- Best Practice Report on a Concerted, Faith-Based Initiative: Scaling up Toward Universal Access to HIV Prevention, Care, Support, and Treatment: The Catholic Church Response to HIV in India New Delhi: Commission for Health, Catholic Bishops’ Conference of India (2008)
- Guía de Formación Pastoral en Respuesta al VIH/SIDA desarollado por Robert J. Vitillo, publicado por Caritas Hondureña, Caritas Zona Camexpa y Caritas Noruega, 2010.

Articles

- Keeping children HIV-free and keeping their mothers alive, Caritas Internationalis, 2012, archived from the original on August 28, 2016
- "Ethical Issues Related to Preventing the Further Spread of HIV: Teachings and Actions of the Catholic Church", AIDS: 30 Years Down the Line: Faith-based Reflections about the Epidemic in Africa, Nairobi: Paulines Publications Africa, 2012
- "Camminando con Gesù verso Emmaus: un pellegrinaggio di speranza e amore", Orientamenti pastorali, Centro di Orientamento Pastorale, 2013
- Pushing to end HIV/AIDS in Australasia, Caritas Internationalis, 2014
- Spiritual Needs and Pastoral Care for HIV/AIDS Patients, Caritas Internationalis, 2014
- People first when planning the way forward with HIV/AIDS, Caritas Internationalis, 2014
- The Constant Challenges of Treating Children with HIV, Caritas Internationalis, 2014
- To end AIDS by 2030, Caritas Internationalis, 2014
- New Tech Solutions for HIV, Caritas Internationalis, 2014
- On the Frontline of a Deadly Fight: The Ebola Epidemic, The Tablet, 2014
- Discerning the Meaning of Human Suffering Through the Discourse of Judeo-Christian Scriptures and Other Faith Teachings, Journal of Pain and Symptom Management, 2014
- West Africa Needs More International Help to Defeat Ebola, Eureka Street, 2014
- Caritas Internationalis Seeks Ministry's Support in Response to the Ebola Epidemic, Health World, 2014
- Caritas Internationalis: Service and Advocacy, Health Progress, Journal of the Catholic Health Association of the United States, 2015
