= International Criminal Justice Review =

- Discipline: Criminal law
- Language: English
- Edited by: Scott Jacques

Publication details
- History: 1991-present
- Publisher: SAGE Publications
- Frequency: Quarterly

Standard abbreviations
- ISO 4: Int. Crim. Justice Rev.

Indexing
- ISSN: 1057-5677 (print); 1556-3855 (web)
- LCCN: 91002810
- OCLC no.: 24059483

Links
- Journal homepage; Online access; Online archive

The International Criminal Justice Review is a quarterly peer-reviewed academic journal that covers the field of criminal law. The editor-in-chief is Scott Jacques (Georgia State University). The journal was established in 1991 and is published by SAGE Publications in association with the Andrew Young School of Policy Studies (Georgia State University).

== Abstracting and indexing ==
The journal is abstracted and indexed in:

- Criminal Justice Abstracts
- PAIS International
- ProQuest databases
- SafetyLit
- Sociological Abstracts
