= Suicide of Charlotte O'Brien =

2024 suicide of Australian child

Charlotte O'Brien
- Born: Charlotte Frances O'Brien; 2 January 2012
- Died: 9 September 2024 (aged 12)
- Cause of death: Suicide
- Occupation: Student
- Known for: Taking her own life after being bullied

Charlotte Frances O'Brien (2 January 2012 – 9 September 2024) was an Australian child who died by suicide at the age of 12.

== Background ==
At the time of her death, O'Brien was a Year 7 student at Santa Sabina College in the inner-western Sydney suburb of Strathfield.

During her time at the school, O'Brien was bullied by other students.

O'Brien's family allege that despite approaching the school repeatedly with their concerns about the bullying, the school failed to adequately address the issue.

The school has publicly disputed the amount of times the family approached them with concerns prior to O'Brien's death.

== Death ==
O'Brien died by suicide on 9 September 2024.

According to O'Brien's family, she had left a note in which she refers to the bullying she had encountered at the school, and that life was too difficult to continue.

Her death was widely reported and prompted a national conversation about the best ways to manage bullying, with her family urging schools to take complaints more seriously.

After her death, O'Brien's parents established an online fundraiser called "Charlotte's legacy" to raise money for the charity Kids Helpline.

Her funeral was held with a mass of Christian burial at Mary Immaculate Catholic Church in the Sydney suburb of Bossley Park on 27 September 2024, which was followed by a private cremation.

O'Brien's family encouraged mourners to donate to Kids Helpline in lieu of buying flowers.

== School response ==
O'Brien's stepfather Mat O'Brien alleges that substantial action was not taken by his stepdaughter's school despite having spoken to the school on a number of occasions. O'Brien's mother claims she had attempted to raise the issue with the school at least 20 times with the first of many emails having been sent in August 2022.

In a letter read on air by 2GB's Ben Fordham, O'Brien's stepfather Mat O'Brien stated: "When the most recent case of bullying was raised, the school simply said it was investigated and the girls denied it. That's it. Case closed. Move on."

In a subsequent interview with 2GB, he said: "I'm looking for the schools to step in and act when things are raised for the first time, not the second time or third time." He also urged schools to change the terminology relating to bullying complaints, taking issue with the phrase "friendship issues".

Despite their criticisms of the school regarding the alleged bullying, the family have publicly stated that they do not blame any of the school's students for O'Brien's death with Kelly O'Brien stating: "They are also just little girls, they don't understand" while Mat O'Brien has provided reassurances that he was not after any "retribution" as he knew they were "dealing with 12-year-old girls".

Responding to family's allegations, Santa Sabina College principal Paulina Skerman claimed the school was unaware of the allegations aired on 2GB describing the claims as "new to the college" and "not consistent" with their records.

In response, the O'Brien family said there was either an issue with the school's record keeping or they were facing accusations from the school of being liars.

Skerman also warned media outlets to take "immense care in reporting" to avoid further issues being created for vulnerable young people. Skerman also assured students and parents that mental health provider Headspace would be at the school to provide counselling for students to help them manage "grief, sadness, uncertainty and confusion".

In the days after O'Brien's death, nearby school Presbyterian Ladies' College was criticised for stating they did not intend to speak to their students about the suicide while also advising parents to not speak to their daughters unless they raise it with them, instead prioritising the need for their students to be "settled and focused" for upcoming exams.

== See also ==
- Suicide of Dolly Everett
