= Tertiary education fees in Australia =

Fees charged to students who attend Australian tertiary education institutions

People attending a tertiary institution in Australia as a percentage of the local population at the 2011 census, geographically subdivided by statistical local area

Tertiary education fees in Australia are payable for courses at tertiary education institutions. Responsibility for fees in vocational education and training (VET) rests primarily with the state and territory governments, while fees policy in higher education is largely controlled by the Commonwealth Government.

For most domestic students in higher education, the Commonwealth Government provides loans, subsidies, and/or social security welfare payments & benefits to relieve the cost of tertiary education. These benefits are not available to international students. Some domestic students are supported by the government and are required to pay only part of the cost of tuition, called the "student contribution", and the government pays the balance. Some government supported students can defer payment of their contribution as a HECS-HELP loan. Other domestic students are full fee-paying (non-Commonwealth supported) and do not receive direct government contribution to the cost of their education. Some domestic students in full fee courses can obtain a FEE-HELP loan from the Australian government up to a lifetime limit of $150,000 for medicine, dentistry and veterinary science programs and $104,440 for all other programs.

Student fees for vocational education vary between jurisdictions, with some states implementing fee-free courses in some fields and all offering some form of government subsidised training. Funding responsibilities for student fee subsidies are agreed between state and territory governments and the Commonwealth under the National Skills Agreement which commenced at the start of 2024.

Australian citizens (and in some cases overseas professionals completing bridging studies in order to be accredited permanent residents) are able to obtain loans from the government under the Higher Education Loan Programme (HELP) which replaced the Higher Education Contribution Scheme (HECS). As of April 2016, the amount of money owed to the Australian government under the HECS scheme was AUD$60 billion and is expected to increase to $180 billion by 2026.

HELP is jointly administered by the Australian Department of Education, Skills and Employment and the Australian Taxation Office (ATO). In addition, qualified students may be entitled to Youth Allowance or Austudy Payment to assist them financially while they are studying. These support payments are means and assets tested. Further assistance is available in the form of scholarships. Overseas students are charged fees for the full cost of their education and are ineligible for HELP loans, but may apply for international scholarships.

== History ==
In 1940, the Curtin Labor government dramatically increased the number of scholarships to increase the number of university graduates and allowed women avail these scholarships as they were previously exclusive to men. In the 1960s, the Menzies Liberal government rapidly established new universities, mostly in outlying suburbs, and offered special research scholarships to encourage students to undertake postgraduate research studies. Many of these universities are members of Innovative Research Universities Australia. In 1967, the government created a category of Commonwealth-funded non-university tertiary institutions, called College of Advanced Education (CAE), to provide cheaper and easier access to the equivalent of bachelor's degrees.

In 1974, the Whitlam Labor government abolished university fees to make tertiary education in Australia more accessible to working and middle class Australians. In 1989, the Hawke Labor government began gradually re-introducing fees for university study and setup the Higher Education Contributions Scheme (HECS).

=== Present status ===
In 1996, the Howard Coalition government, introduced tiers in the HECS fee structure (now called HECS-HELP). Fees are charged on the basis of the perceived value of courses. Courses considered to have most likelihood of generating higher income for students in the future (e.g. Law and Medicine) are the most expensive; those least likely to generate higher income (e.g. Nursing and Arts) are the least expensive. Since 2007, HECS places are known as Commonwealth Supported Places (CSP). A student in a CSP is only entitled to study for a maximum of 7 years full-time (16 years part-time) at CSP rates after 2022. This is known as a Student Learning Entitlement (SLE). After that period the student has to take either a FEE-HELP loan (if available) or study at full-fee rates. If a student receives a HECS-HELP loan, the Commonwealth government pays the loan amount directly to the higher education provider on behalf of the student.

An alternative option is FEE-HELP which provides eligible fee-paying students with a loan to cover their tertiary education fees.

== Commonwealth Supported Places (CSP) & Student Contribution (SC) ==
The Commonwealth government determines the number and allocation of undergraduate "Commonwealth Supported Places" (CSP) with each public higher education provider each year, through the Commonwealth Grant Scheme (CGS). A CSP is a higher education place for which the Commonwealth government makes a contribution to the higher education provider towards the cost of a student's education. The student makes a contribution towards the cost of education, known as the "Student Contribution" (SC). Commonwealth supported places are available to citizens of Australia, New Zealand and Australian permanent residents.

The majority of CSPs are managed through the Tertiary Admissions Centre (TACs) in each state or territory, although universities make the selections, deciding which students they will make offers to.

The allocation is usually based on secondary school results (through the ATAR scores), TAFE qualifications and previous university results.

The student contribution varies between courses, and is based on the expected earnings following a students' graduation, not the cost of providing the course. Higher education providers can set the student contribution level for each unit of study, up to a maximum level set by the government. It is said that, due to government underfunding of universities, universities almost always charge the highest level allowable.

Equivalent Full-time Student Load (EFTSL) is a measure of a student’s annual study load as expressed in relation to the relevant full-time equivalent – usually 8 courses (subjects) per academic year. Example if a student studies 4 per year their EFTSL would be 0.5 (assuming 1 ESTSL for their program of study is 8 courses per year, with each course being worth 0.125 EFTSL).

Student contribution
Band	Curriculum areas	CSP students		HECS students	
Band	Curriculum areas	2010– (Note: Maximum contribution per EFTSL (Note: EFTSL stands for Equivalent Full-Time Student Load. It is a measure of the study load, for a year, of a student undertaking a course of study on a full-time basis.))	2005–09	1997–2004	Pre-1997
National priority	Mathematics, (Note: Added 2010 reform) Statistics, Science	$0–$4,429	$0–$4,162	$0–$4,077	$0–$3,061
Band 1	Education, (Note: Removed 2010 reform) Nursing, Humanities, Behavioural science, Social studies, Foreign languages, Visual and Performing arts, Nursing, Education, Clinical Psychology	$0–$5,310	$0–$5,201	$0–$4,077	$0–$3,061
Band 2	Computing, Built Environment, Health sciences, Engineering, Surveying, Agriculture	$0–$7,567	$0–$7,412	$0–$5,807	$0–$3,061
Band 3	Law, Dentistry, Medicine, Pharmacy, Veterinary science, Accounting, Administration, Economics, Commerce	$0–$8,859	$0–$8,677	$0–$6,798	$0–$3,061
Notes:

Between 2012 and 2017, an eligible student who paid the entire or a part of the student contribution upfront received a 10% HECS discount on the amount paid (prior to 2012, the HECS discount was 20%). Only Australian citizens and permanent humanitarian visa holders were eligible for the up-front 10% HECS discount. The up-front discount was removed on 1 January 2017.

=== Total funding ===
The total funding available to institutions per equivalent full-time student is the combination of the student contribution (divided into 3 different amounts/bands) and the Commonwealth government contribution (divided into 8 different amounts/clusters). For 2017, these are:

Total funding
Commonwealth funding	Student contribution	Discipline	Full fee $	Commonwealth contribution $	Student contribution $
cluster 1	Band 3	Law, accounting, commerce, economics, administration	12685	2089	10596
cluster 2	Band 1	Humanities	12158	5809	6349
cluster 3	Band 1	Behavioural science or social studies	16627	10278	6349
cluster 3	Band 2	Mathematics, statistics, computing, built environment or other health	19328	10278	9050
cluster 4	Band 1	Education	17044	10695	6349
cluster 5	Band 1	Clinical psychology, foreign languages, or visual and performing arts	18990	12641	6349
cluster 5	Band 2	Allied health	21691	12641	9050
cluster 6	Band 1	Nursing	20462	14113	6349
cluster 7	Band 2	Engineering, science, surveying	27021	17971	9050
cluster 8	Band 2	Agriculture	31859	22809	9050
cluster 8	Band 3	Dentistry, medicine or veterinary science	33405	22809	10596

== Full fee-paying students ==
Full fee places for Australian undergraduate students were phased out in 2009 under reforms made by the Gillard government.

Other students may obtain a full fee place (FFP) if they do not receive a Commonwealth supported place, subject to meeting relevant qualifications. Most postgraduate courses do not have Commonwealth supported places available and therefore, all these students are full fee-paying. Fee-paying students are charged the full cost of their course, with no Commonwealth contribution.

Some fee-paying students can obtain loans under the Higher Education Loan Programme, called FEE-HELP loans, to cover all or part of their fees. This is available to Australian citizens, New Zealand citizens and permanent humanitarian visa holders. Undergraduate students who obtain these loans are charged a 20% loan fee on top of the amount borrowed. This does not apply to postgraduate courses. Students are able to borrow a lifetime maximum FEE-HELP loan of $112,134 for medicine, dentistry and veterinary science programs and $89,706 for all other programs (adjusted for inflation). In 2005, FEE-HELP loans replaced the Open Learning Deferred Payment Scheme (OLDPS), the Postgraduate Education Loan Scheme (PELS) and the Bridging for Overseas-Trained Professionals Loan Scheme (BOTPLS).

== OS-HELP ==
OS-HELP is a loan scheme to assist some undergraduate domestic students to undertake some, but not all, of their course of study overseas. Students are able to obtain a loan up to $6,470 (if the student will not be studying in Asia) or $7,764 (if the student will be studying in Asia) every six months, but can only receive a total of two loans throughout their lifetime. Unlike other loans in the HELP, the loan amount is paid directly to the student and the terms for the loans are set out by the tertiary providers.

As in the FEE-HELP loan scheme, a 20% fee applies on the amount borrowed. This 20% "administration fee" was removed for OS-HELP loans received after January 1, 2010.

== SA-HELP ==
SA-HELP loan covers the SSAF (student services and amenities fee). Universities are not allowed to charge more than A$336 per year as SSAF.

== HELP loans ==
=== HELP loan management ===
HELP debts do not attract interest (in the normal sense), but are instead indexed to the Consumer Price Index (CPI) on 1 June each year, based on the annual CPI to March of that year. The indexation rate applied on 1 June 2006 was 2.8% and 3.4% on 1 June 2007. Indexation applies to the part of the debt that has been unpaid for 11 months or more. Thus, indexation is calculated on the opening HELP debt balance on 1 July of the previous year plus any debt incurred in the first half of the current year (usually for first semester courses) less any compulsory and voluntary repayments, with bonus. Any HELP debt incurred on second semester courses (usually determined in June) will not be subject to indexation until the next year. After indexation, the new balance is rounded down to a whole dollar amount. Additionally, HELP debts are subject to a 25% fee which does not count towards a student’s HELP debt limit.

As of 1 January 2017 the Commonwealth Government removed the 5% voluntary repayment bonus on all HELP debt repayments.

If a person with an accumulated HELP debt dies, any compulsory repayment included on their income tax notice of assessment relating to the period prior to their death must be paid from their estate, but the remainder of their debt is cancelled.

=== Repayments ===
HELP debts are administered by the Australian Taxation Office and will be repaid compulsorily over time through the taxation system. If the HELP Repayment Income (HRI) of a person with a HELP debt exceeds a certain threshold, which for the 2014/15 financial year is $53,345, a compulsory payment will be deducted from the person's tax for the year. The HRI is the person's taxable income plus any net rental loss claimed against that taxable income and adding fringe benefits, reportable superannuation contributions and foreign income received, normally exempt from taxation.

Unlike marginal tax rates, the repayment rate applies on the full HRI, so that a person with a HRI below $45,881 in 2019/20 will not need to make a compulsory HELP repayment, but a person with a HRI of $80,000 would make a payment of $4,400. This is 5.5% of the HRI (not taxable income or the debt balance) of $80,000. The compulsory repayment amount cannot exceed the balance of the HELP debt.

The rates for compulsory repayment since 2006 have been:

HELP Repayment Income (HRI) compulsory repayment 2006–2012
2006–07	2007–08	2008–09	2009–10	2010–11	2011–12	Repayment rate
Below $38,149	Below $39,825	Below $41,595	Below $43,151	Below $44,912	Below $47,196	Nil
$38,149–$42,494	$39,825–$44,360	$41,595–$46,333	$43,151–$48,066	$44,912–$50,028	$47,196–$52,572	4% of HRI
$42,495–$46,938	$44,360–$48,896	$46,334–$51,070	$48,067–$52,980	$50,029–$55,143	$52,573–$57,947	4.5% of HRI
$46,839–$49,300	$48,897–$51,466	$51,071–$53,754	$52,981–$55,764	$55,144–$58,041	$57,948–$60,993	5% of HRI
$49,301–$52,994	$51,466–$55,322	$53,755–$57,782	$55,765–$59,943	$58,042–$62,390	$60,994–$65,563	5.5% of HRI
$52,995–$57,394	$55,323–$59,915	$57,783–$62,579	$59,944–$64,919	$62,391–$67,570	$65,564–$71,006	6% of HRI
$57,395–$60,414	$59,916–$63,068	$62,580–$65,873	$64,920–$68,336	$67,571–$71,126	$71,007–$74,743	6.5% of HRI
$60,415–$66,485	$63,069–$69,405	$65,874–$72,492	$68,337–$75,203	$71,127–$78,273	$74,744–$82,253	7% of HRI
$66,486–$70,846	$69,406–$73,959	$72,493–$77,247	$75,204–$80,136	$78,274–$83,407	$82,254–$87,649	7.5% of HRI
$70,847 and above	$73,960 and above	$77,248 and above	$80,137 and above	$83,408 and above	$87,650 and above	8% of HRI

HELP Repayment Income (HRI) compulsory repayment 2012–2020
2012–13	2013–14	2014–15	2015–16	2017–18	2018–19	2019–20	Repayment rate
Below $49,096	Below $51,309	Below $53,345	Below $54,126	Below 55,874	Below 51,957	Below 45,881	Nil
						45,881–52,973	1% of HRI
					51,957–57,729	52,974–56,151	2% of HRI
						56,152–59,521	2.5% of HRI
						59,522–63,092	3% of HRI
						63,093–66,877	3.5% of HRI
$49,096–$54,688	$51,309–$57,153	$53,345–$59,421	$54,126–$60,292	55,874–62,238	57,730–64,306	66,878–70,890	4% of HRI
$54,689–$60,279	$57,154–$62,997	$59,422–$65,497	$60,293—$66,456	62,238–68,602	64,307–70,881	70,891–75,144	4.5% of HRI
$60,280–$63,448	$62,998–$66,308	$65,498–$68,939	$66,457–$69,949	68,603–72,207	70,882–74,607	75,145–79,652	5% of HRI
$63,449–$68,202	$66,309–$71,277	$68,940–$74,105	$69,950–$75,190	72,208–77,618	74,608–80,197	79,653–84,432	5.5% of HRI
$68,203–$73,864	$71,278–$77,194	$74,106–$80,257	$75,191–$81,432	77,619–84,062	80,198–86,855	84,433–89,498	6% of HRI
$73,865–$77,751	$77,195–$81,256	$80,258–$84,481	$81,433 – $85,718	84,063–88,486	86,856–91,425	89,499–94,868	6.5% of HRI
$77,752–$85,564	$81,257–$89,421	$84,482–$92,970	$85,719–$94,331	88,487–97,377	91,426–100,613	94,869–100,560	7% of HRI
$85,565–$91,177	$89,422–$95,287	$92,971–$99,069	$94,332–$100,519	97,378–103,765	100,614–107,213	100,561–106,593	7.5% of HRI
$91,178 and above	$95,288 and above	$99,070 and above	$100,520 and above	103,766 and above	107,214 and above	106,594–112,989	8% of HRI
						112,990–119,769	8.5% of HRI
						119,770–126,955	9% of HRI
						126,956–134,572	9.5% of HRI
						134,573 and above	10% of HRI

It is also possible to make voluntary payments to further reduce the debt. Until 31 December 2004 voluntary payments over $500 earned a 15% bonus, from 1 January 2005 this was reduced to 10% and from 1 January 2012 this was reduced to 5%. From 1 January 2017 the government removed the 5% repayment bonus.

== See also ==
- Tertiary education in Australia
- Education in Australia
- Taxation in Australia
