= Austudy =

Austudy or AUSTUDY may refer to:

- Austudy Payment, the current Australian Government social security payment for students, paid under the Social Security Act 1991
- AUSTUDY Scheme, the former Australian Government payment for students, paid under the Student Assistance Act 1973
- Austudy Five, a group of activists in Melbourne in 1992
