= First Nations Workers Alliance =

Union for Indigenous Australians

FNWA
- First Nations Workers Alliance
- Founded: June 2017
- Headquarters: Melbourne
- Key people: Lara Watson, Coordinator, Kara Keys, ACTU Indigenous Officer
- Affiliations: ACTU
- Website: fnwa.org.au

The First Nations Workers Alliance (FNWA) was established in June 2017 to provide an individualised union for indigenous Australian members to be represented on a range of unique issues. The FNWA is parented by the Australian Council of Trade Unions (ACTU), and was launched under the union movements' renewed focus on indigenous working rights.

== Current campaigns ==
The FNWA is currently campaigning on behalf of the Aboriginal and Torres Strait Islander CDP workers, which the ACTU and the FNWA claim is racially discriminatory. The ACTU (head of the Alliance) has resolved to use all means available to the union to explore "legal and legislative challenges to the program, as well as the mobilization of campaign resources."

=== Community Development Program (CDP) ===
The Community Development Program (CDP) is a work-for-the-dole scheme used in remote communities for job seekers. Replacing the Remote Jobs and Communities Program in 2015, the program currently operates in "60 regions and more than 1,000 communities across Australia." As the program specifically targets remote areas, the main reasons for unemployment can be attributed to weak labour markets and difficulty gaining experience. The CDP requires job seekers to complete 25 hours of work per week for all weeks of the year, (currently due to be reduced to 20 hours per week in early 2019. These job services are provided in a range of activities for $11.60 an hour. These activities are aimed at improving the community and providing new skills for the job seekers.

As of 30 June 2018 the government states that the CDP "has supported remote job seekers into more than 25,584 Jobs" since the implementation of the program in 2015. The program currently has approximately 32,000 people registered, with more than 80% of workers being indigenous people in remote areas.

==== Criticism of the CDP ====
The CDP was referred to the Finance and public administration references committee for a Senate inquiry and report on 22 March 2017. The findings of the inquiry were handed down on 14 December 2017. The Senate inquiry handed down 22 recommendations, ranging from financial penalties to government support for remote communities. The report also concluded that "The committee is of the view that CDP cannot and should not continue in its current form. A new program needs to be developed which moves away from a centralised, top-down administration in which communities are told what to do and move towards a model where the local communities are empowered to make decisions that are best for them."

Financial penalties for workers on CDP are one of the biggest areas of concern for the FNWA. Those currently under the care of the CDP receive different penalties for missing or refusing suitable work than those on Newstart in major cities. As the vast majority of recipients of CDP are indigenous, the differing requirement for financial penalties are regarded by the FNWA as "racially discriminatory".

Since the program was rolled out in 2015, "more than 340,000 fines have been issued to people enrolled in the Community Development Program". The financial penalties currently being handed out under the CDP are more frequent, as the CDP has seen a "740% increase in financial penalties since it replaced the previous remote job and communities program in 2015." Pro Bono News Australia reported that "CDP participants currently have to work up to 500 hours more per year than those covered by metropolitan work-for-the-dole programs, and were 25 times more likely to be fined than other work-for-the-dole participant". The Senate committee responsible for the inquiry into the CDP reported in the recommendations:

That the Australian Government immediately replace the current CDP compliance and penalty regime with obligations that are no more onerous than those of other income support recipients. CDP participants must have the same legal rights and other responsibilities as other income support participants, taking into account special circumstances such as remote locations and cultural obligations.

The FNWA considers the change in fines and the inconsistency in penalty sanctions between CDP workers and those on city-based work-for-the-dole projects "racially discriminatory".
