= Social security in Australia =

Welfare payments provided by the Australian Government

Social security in Australia refers to a system of social welfare payments provided by the Australian Government and the states and territories of Australia to eligible Australian citizens, permanent residents, and limited international visitors. These payments are almost always administered by Centrelink, a program of Services Australia. In Australia, most payments are means tested.

The system includes payments to retirees, job seekers, parents (especially new and single parents), people with disabilities and their caregivers, guardians of orphans, students and apprentices, and people who have no way of supporting themselves.

== History ==
Prior to 1900 in Australia, charitable assistance from benevolent societies, sometimes with financial contributions from the authorities, was the primary means of relief for people not able to support themselves. The 1890s economic depression and the rise of the trade unions and the Labor parties during this period led to a movement for welfare reform.

In 1900, New South Wales and Victoria enacted legislation introducing non-contributory pensions for those aged 65 and over. Queensland legislated a similar system in 1907 before the Deakin government introduced a national aged pension under the Invalid and Old-Aged Pensions Act 1908. A national invalid disability pension was started in 1910, and a national maternity allowance was introduced in 1912. The old age pension and invalid pension were restricted to those of "good character", and the maternity allowance was not given to Aboriginals, Asians, or Pacific Islanders. Also in 1907, the Harvester case created a living wage with the assumptions of a man with three children and a dependent wife, closer to subsistence than a comfortable existence.

In 1923, the Bruce-Page government announced plans to develop a comprehensive national social security scheme, which was typically referred to as National Insurance in line with the terminology used in Britain. The government established a royal commission on national insurance in 1923 and introduced a bill in 1928, which failed to pass before the government was defeated. The Lyons government later passed the National Health and Pensions Insurance Act 1938, which would have enacted the scheme but was ultimately abandoned in the lead-up to World War II. Lacking a national scheme forms of government welfare were administered by local and state governments. The introduction of various schemes, and improvements in them, were often secured after protest campaigns by unemployed community members.

During the Second World War, the federal government significantly accelerated the development of Australia's welfare state, led by Prime Minister John Curtin and Treasurer Ben Chifley. The Menzies government enacted a child endowment scheme in 1941 (superseding the 1927 New South Wales scheme), while the Curtin government enacted a widows' pension in 1942 (superseding the New South Wales 1926 scheme); a wife's allowance in 1943; additional allowances for the children of pensioners in 1943; and unemployment, sickness, and special benefits in 1945 (superseding the Queensland 1923 scheme). The success of the 1946 Social Services referendum modified the Australian Constitution explicitly granting the Commonwealth power to legislate for maternity allowances, widows pensions, child endowment, unemployment, pharmaceutical, sickness and hospital benefits, medical and dental services, and student and family allowances, allowing further welfare initiatives by Prime Minister Ben Chifley's post-war government. From the end of the Second World War until 1975, Australian governments had a policy of full employment – from 1946 the Commonwealth Employment Service assisted a quarter of the workforce in finding paid employment that was suited to them, helping to keep the unemployment rate very low.

In 2001, Amanda Vanstone and Tony Abbott made a joint cabinet submission arguing that particular groups of welfare recipients, particularly single parents, needed to be "guided towards work" through compulsion, including literacy programs, regular reporting by recipients, and a Work for the Dole scheme.

The Social Services Legislation Amendment (Welfare Reform) Bill 2017 has changed several aspects of social security in Australia, and has been given assent to as of 11 April 2018. It includes a demerit-point system for not meeting welfare obligations. As of June 2018, former social security recipients who owe a debt to Centrelink will not be allowed to travel outside Australia until they have repaid their debt, with interest.

== Contemporary welfare attitudes ==
Bert Kelly and Clyde Cameron popularised the term "dole bludger" in the 1970s, causing welfare recipients to be viewed as parasites upon "ordinary Australian" taxpayers. Prior to this, high unemployment was seen as a failure of the economy and government, not individual welfare recipients. Negative characterisations were challenged during the 1970s and 1980s by unemployed organisations. These organised numerous protests and marches, which typically demanded that governments do more to create work, that welfare payments match the cost of living, and that social security recipients not be subject to invasive and patronising treatment. Economists argue that Australia needs more unemployed people to control demand and therefore inflation. Current attitudes toward welfare in Australia can be separated into support for the welfare system and support for welfare recipients. A 2015 multivariate analysis using canonical correlation analysis identified five distinct profiles of welfare attitudes and socio-demographic characteristics.

The main attitude cluster was one toward support for the welfare system and welfare recipients. Having received government welfare in the past strongly predicted a person supporting the welfare system and its beneficiaries. The next most prominent attitude profile was summarised as "the welfare system is good but the people on it are lazy and dependent". This attitude profile was found among people receiving welfare payments that were either normative (e.g., the age pension) or where there is little expectation that a person will return to work (e.g. disability support pension). A 2017 study showed that overall, Australians held more negative attitudes toward welfare recipients than they did the welfare system. People with a history of receiving unemployment benefits had more negative welfare attitudes if they lived in areas where other community members had more negative attitudes.

== Eligibility and exclusions ==
Australian citizens are eligible for various payments that they may be entitled to. New Zealand citizens have to pass a range of criteria to access different levels of payments, Permanent residents have to pass various waiting periods of between one and four years to become eligible for various levels of benefits.

Asylum seekers in Australia who have applied for a protection visa and whose bridging visa has expired have no access to Centrelink payments or other social services, nor Medicare benefits, and are not allowed to work. It was estimated in July 2022 that there were around 2000 people in this situation.

== Legal framework ==
Social security payments and other benefits are currently made available under the following acts of parliament:

- Social Security Act 1991
- A New Tax System (Family Assistance) Act 1999
- Student Assistance Act 1973
- Paid Parental Leave Act 2010

== Payments under the Social Security Act and the Student Assistance Act ==
These are available only to the "domestic students", i.e. Australian citizens and permanent residents, etc. These benefits are not available to the "international students".

- ABSTUDY – offers a range of allowances to assist Indigenous students and New Apprentices.
- Age Pension – for people planning for retirement or who are already retired aged 67 years and over.
- Assistance for Isolated Children – for families with a child who cannot attend school locally because of distance or special needs.
- Austudy Payment – for full-time students and New Apprentices aged 25 years or over.
- Carer Allowance – for people who care for individuals over 16 years with a disability or age-related special need.
- Carer Allowance (Child) – for people who care for a child under 16 years with a disability.
- Carer Payment – for people who provide full-time care for someone with a disability.
- Disability Support Pension – for people unable to work for at least 2 years due to illness, injury or disability.
- Double Orphan Pension – for people who are raising children who have lost both parents.
- Maternity Payment – for help with those extra costs after the birth of a new baby.
- JobSeeker Payment – for people who are looking for employment, also often given to those in the application process for Disability Support Pension.
- Parenting Payment – for parents or guardians to help with the cost of raising children under 6 for partnered parents and under 14 for sole parents.
- Pensioner Education Supplement – for people on pensions with education expenses.
- Special Benefit – for people who are in financial hardship, have no way of supporting themselves and are not entitled to another payment (normally due to residency requirements).
- Youth Allowance – for full-time students or New Apprentices aged 15 (under some circumstances) 16 to 24 and people aged under 21 who are undertaking job search or a combination of approved activities.

=== Income support ===
All Centrelink income support payments are payable fortnightly, usually by direct deposit into the recipient's bank account. They are also subject to a means test which calculates the recipient (and their partner's) fortnightly income and assets and affects the rate of their payment accordingly. As such, people on lower incomes may be entitled to part-payment of their allowance (subject to other qualification requirements). The assessment of income and assets varies greatly between different social security payments and the effect that income and assets have on each payment differs in that they have different income thresholds (i.e. how much income one can earn before it affects their payment) and different taper rates (the amount the payment drops by per dollar above these thresholds).

An individual may be precluded from claiming any of income support payments listed below for a certain number of weeks following receipt of a lump sum compensation payment, made wholly or partly in respect of lost earnings or lost capacity to earn resulting from personal injury (often received in settlement of a Workers' Compensation claim). The number of weeks for which the preclusion period applies to an individual is proportional the size of the lump sum payment they received. Centrelink has a discretion to reduce the duration of the preclusion period if it is satisfied that there exist special circumstances that make an individual's case out of the ordinary: for example, extreme financial hardship.

==== Age Pension ====
The age pension was the first payment made by the Australian Government, dating back to 1909. There is no automatic entitlement to an age pension in Australia, unlike in countries such as the UK or New Zealand. Taxpayer-funded pensions are means tested (similar to the UK's Pension Credit), effectively making them another type of benefit. Except for the mandatory superannuation scheme, workers do not contribute to a pension or insurance scheme in Australia, unlike pension schemes in many other countries.

The age pension is subject to a number of requirements:

- the age pension is available to persons over what is referred to as the Age Pension age. The pension age has been increasing since 2017 by six-month periods every two years from the previous pension age of 65 years. On 1 July 2021, the pension age became 66 years and 6 months, and from 1 July 2023, the pension age will increase to 67, the proposed cap.
- a residency requirement requires an applicant to have been a resident in Australia for the last 10 years, with no break in residency for 5 of those years, and be in Australia on the day the application is lodged. If the applicant is a resident in one of the 31 country with which Australia has an International Social Security Agreement, residence in that country may count towards the minimum 10-year residence requirement. The applicant may be entitled to other residency exemptions such as lodging the claim in an agreement country.
- income and assets tests apply and determine whether a pension is payable and the rate of payment. Deeming rules are used to assess income from financial assets. Since 1 January 2015, the deeming rules also apply to account-based income streams.

==== JobSeeker Payment ====
JobSeeker Payment is the main unemployment benefit paid to eligible Australians and permanent residents aged 22 to 64. To be eligible, a person must apply for the benefit and be actively seeking work, undertaking approved training or performing approved volunteer work.

On 1 July 1991, the "Newstart Allowance" replaced the Unemployment Benefit (UB) which had been unchanged since 1945. The Unemployment Benefit was designed to be a temporary measure for the worker, and it was set at well below the basic wage. The Newstart Allowance was part of a government reform called Newstart – the Active Employment Strategy.

The Newstart Allowance was formally renamed to the JobSeeker Payment on 20 March 2020.

A job seeker receiving this payment is paid on the basis of a 'mutual agreement' between the customer and Centrelink, where Centrelink will continue to pay fortnightly payments to the customer for so long as the customer attempts to find employment and fulfills their mutual obligation requirements. These mutual agreements are negotiated between Centrelink and the job seeker, and often includes participation in the jobactive program. These agreements are then recorded in a "Job Plan", a written document which outlines the personal process for an individual to no longer need the JobSeeker Payment. Activities to which a job seeker may have to agree, in order to continue receiving the Newstart Allowance, include applying for a specific number of jobs (usually ten) per fortnight and recording these applications in a Centrelink issued diary, undertaking vocational education or training, paid work experience, participation in a labour market program or Work for the Dole project, and other activities, such as voluntary work if considered appropriate by Centrelink. For example, more elderly customers who have been made redundant and are approaching the age pension age, and who may face considerable difficulties re-entering the labour market, are often permitted to fulfil their plan by engaging in voluntary activities alone. A job seeker has to nominate and engage in one activity (for example, either a vocational education activity or Work for the Dole activity) in any one mutual obligation period (lasting six months at a time).

Clients are not expected to engage in the more intensive of these activities as soon as their receipt of the allowance commences. The amount of activity required on behalf of the client in order to continue receiving their benefit is usually staggered as follows:

- Ordinarily, during the first three months of unemployment, a job seeker has no other obligations but to submit a fortnightly Application For Payment form at the local office. The form asks the applicant a number of questions about their circumstances and for the basic details of four positions for which the job seeker applied in the last fortnight. Customers may also be required to make up to 10 'Job Search Contacts' per fortnight (dependent on the local labour market and their personal circumstances) and record the details of these jobs within a specifically issued Job Seeker Diary for a given period of time. The job seeker then takes the Application For Payment form personally to the local Centrelink Office. They will then attend a short one-on-one interview with a Centrelink officer. The interview is usually for the purposes of checking that the application form is in order and that the applicant is aware of any appointments that may need to be attended, and obligations that may need to be met. The client at this stage also has the opportunity to talk to a Centrelink officer about any problems the client may be encountering without having to make a prior appointment first.
- If after an initial three months of unemployment, during which the job seeker has only to hand in the fortnightly application form and record the Job Seeker Diary, the client remains unemployed; the client will be required to attend appointments with a Job Services Australia provider whose responsibility it is to assist the client to re-enter the workforce. The job seeker also has to attend a two-week training course which focuses on job-searching skills such as writing resumes and attending interviews.
- If the customer remains unemployed for twelve months, they are then subject to the Work Experience Phase of their Employment Pathway Plan, which consists of more intensive assistance involving the activities listed above such as Work for the Dole, accredited study, part-time work, volunteer work or a combination of these. A Job Services Australia provider may require a JobSeeker recipient to do voluntary work (up to 15 hours a week), for which clients receive a supplement to their benefit of $20.80 per fortnight. The supplement is also paid to Work for the Dole participants. They must also continue to apply for four or more positions at the same time to meet their mutual obligations.
- If the client becomes long-term unemployed (24 months or longer), the client's activity requirements will usually consist of another Work Experience Phase style activity for six months in any twelve-month period. (Australia's unemployment benefits do not have a time limit: it is, in theory, possible to remain on unemployment benefits for the whole of one's adult life).

The JobSeeker rates are adjusted on 20 March and 20 September each year. As of September 2013, the basic JobSeeker rate for a single unemployed person without children was A$501 per fortnight. However, this basic rate does not include supplemental payments—including Rent Assistance of up to A$121.00 per fortnight—and other supplements such as Pharmaceutical Allowance, Telephone Allowance, Remote Area Allowance, Training Supplement, and the Work for the Dole Supplement, which are paid depending on personal circumstances and activity. Rates differ for married couples, registered relationships or de facto couples (including same-sex or opposite-sex couples) and persons with children. Despite significant increases in the cost of living, the increases to Newstart/JobSeeker have not kept pace with inflation. The initial income threshold has only risen from 1987's $60 to $62 in 2000.

On 1 March 2010, the Australian Government introduced changes to Disability Employment Services (DES). Multiple existing programs were streamlined into two clearly distinct programs, making assessment and referral processes less complex.

All eligible job seekers with disability have access to individually tailored services which meet their needs including capacity building, training, work experience and other 'interventions' to help participants obtain and maintain suitable employment. DES providers support and manage a participant's condition in the workplace, along with providing ongoing support in the workplace for as long as it is required.

New compliance rules were introduced on 1 July 2011, dealing with client meetings with a DES provider and payment suspension. Data released in mid-November 2013 showed that the number of welfare recipients had grown by 55%. In 2007, 228,621 Newstart Allowance recipients were registered, a total that increased to 646,414 in March 2013.

In January 2014, Patrick McClure was appointed by the Abbott government to a review targeting benefits on people in receipt of Newstart Allowance and the Disability Support Pension, due to report in February 2014.

In the 2016 Australian federal budget, the Turnbull government ceased the clean-energy supplement of $4.40 for people beginning Newstart after 20 September.

In October 2017, the Australian Council of Social Service (ACOSS) stated that the Newstart Allowance was $160 below the poverty line. In May 2018, the Business Council of Australia also advocated for increasing the Newstart Allowance, saying that it is impossible to live on. In March 2018, Newstart was raised by 50 cents per day, which was criticised as inadequate. After handing down the 2018 Australian federal budget, Treasurer Scott Morrison rejected calls to increase the rate of the Newstart Allowance, saying "my priority is to give tax relief to people who are working and paying taxes". Newstart had not been increased since 1994, when it was increased by $2.95 per week.

In 2018, the Anti-Poverty Network of South Australia, with the Newstart Choir, recorded a revised version of the "It's Time" song used by the Australian Labor Party in 1972 to win the election after 23 years of Liberal-Country Coalition government. The song is a campaign to the Australian Labor Party to commit, if elected at the next federal election, to raising Newstart.

In September 2018, the base Newstart rate was raised by $2.20 per week.

On 22 February 2021, Prime Minister Scott Morrison announced that the JobSeeker base rate would be increased by A$50 a fortnight from April 2021 or A$614 a fortnight, with an estimated cost over the forward estimates of A$9 billion. It is also intended to increase the threshold amount recipients can earn before their payment starts to be reduced. The mutual obligations that a recipient must follow also became more demanding.

The Albanese government announced that existing mutual obligation penalties would be wiped clean from people's records as the government transitioned to the Workforce Australia system. Under Workforce Australia, JobSeekers will have to earn 100 points per month and report them online, including four job searches per month, with a list of approved activities each given different points values. In addition to activities that can earn points, jobseekers must attend meetings with job agencies to keep their payments, which can be up to 90 minutes away. A jobseeker in a remote area has had to spend over seven hours away from home in order to attend job agency meetings. Furthermore, a jobseeker has been forced to choose between attending work and attending required job agency meetings. Job agencies can claim 'outcome payments' when they find work for a jobseeker, and also when the jobseeker finds work for themselves.

==== Coronavirus assistance ====
In 2020, as a result of the COVID-19 pandemic and to assist people in isolation and encourage Australia's economic recovery, supplementary payments were added to the basic welfare payments. An additional A$550 per fortnight 'Coronavirus Supplement' was paid, originally only for six months, starting on 27 April and finishing on 24 September 2020.

On 20 July, it was announced that the Supplement would be extended, but in altered form, beyond 24 September. After 24 September, the rate was reduced to $250 per fortnight. On 1 December, it reduced to $150 per fortnight. The Supplement ceased on schedule after 31 March 2021.

The Coronavirus Supplement was paid to recipients of:

- JobSeeker Payment, Partner Allowance, Widow Allowance, Sickness Allowance and Wife Pension
- Youth Allowance for job seekers
- Youth Allowance for students and apprentices
- Austudy for students and apprentices
- ABSTUDY for students getting Living Allowance
- Parenting Payment partnered and single
- Farm Household Allowance
- Special Benefit

In addition, there was also a once-off $750 Economic Support Payment (ESP) paid from late March to eligible JobSeeker Payment and other recipients. A second ESP was only available to those who did not receive the Coronavirus Supplement.

Temporary COVID Disaster Payment

On 3 June 2021, after Victoria's fourth COVID lockdown was extended by a week, the Federal Government announced the 'Temporary COVID Disaster Payment' for people who lose work as a result of lockdowns, of at least 7 days length. These people may be eligible to receive A$325 or A$500 per week, depending on hours of work lost.

==== Youth Allowance ====
Youth Allowance is an income support payment available to unemployed young people aged 16 to 21 (aged 18 to 24 if a full-time student and Australian Apprentices). Youth Allowance recipients are considered to either be dependent on a caregiver(s), or independent. The underlying philosophy of Youth Allowance is that legal guardians are responsible for supporting their children where they have the means if that young person has not lived independently from them.

Dependent recipients are subject to the Parental Income Test and Family Assets Test, unless a parent is in receipt of a specified income support payment themselves. A dependent Youth Allowance recipients may be exempt from the Parental Income Test if their parent is in receipt of an income support payment themselves. A dependent recipient's rate of payment will be reduced as a result of parental income above the parental income free area, although the parental income free area can be increased by sibling concessions.

Dependent Youth Allowance recipients may also be subject to the Family Actual Means Test (FAMT) which applies where the parent is self-employed, involved in a trust or company or several other categories. The rationale behind the FAMT is that the taxable income on which Youth Allowance is normally based may not accurately reflect the true financial means of parents in these categories. It asks for details of the family's spending on living expenses during the relevant tax year and extrapolates an equivalent notional taxable income from this. Sole traders involved in primary production and parents receiving drought assistance such as Exceptional Circumstances Relief Payment are exempt.

All Youth Allowance recipients are subject to the Personal Income Test, which takes into account any income they may earn through part-time or casual work. If an independent Youth Allowance customer has a partner, then their income will be included under the Partner Income Test.

Youth Allowance has lower payment rates for recipients who live with a parent or guardian compared to those who live away from home. Recipients living 'away from home' may also be eligible for Rent Assistance.

15-year-olds can also receive Youth Allowance if they are defined as independent and are over the school leaving age in the state of residence. The school leaving age is 17 in all states and territories of Australia.

Youth Allowance was introduced from July 1998 and replaced Youth Training Allowance and Newstart Allowance for job seekers under 21 and AUSTUDY for students under 25.

In 2009 a number of significant changes to Youth Allowance were announced in that year's Federal Budget. Some of the proposed changes included introducing new scholarships for university students, and changes to the independence criteria and Parental Income Test. These changes were passed by Parliament on 17 March 2010. The changes will be implemented over a number of years, beginning with the introduction of new scholarships from 1 April 2010.

In the 2011–12 Budget, the Australian Government announced that from 1 July 2012, Youth Allowance (other) was to be extended to 21-year-olds (21-year-olds were eligible for Newstart Allowance). 21-year-olds who were on Newstart Allowance, or who had applied for it, by 1 July 2012 were not affected by the change.

==== Austudy Payment ====
The Austudy Payment was originally known as the AUSTUDY Scheme (January 1987 – June 1998), an all-ages study allowance, but since the introduction of Youth Allowance (see above) it has been reserved for the over-25s. To qualify, one must be an Australian resident, over 25, and studying full-time at an approved education institution. However, students who were receiving a Youth Allowance prior to turning 25 and are still pursuing the same course of study continue to receive a Youth Allowance until they finish (or otherwise terminate) their course.

Unlike Youth Allowance, Austudy recipients are considered to be independent and are not subject to the Parental Income Test, Family Assets Test and the Family Actual Means Test. As part of the 2007 Australian federal budget, Austudy Payment recipients were eligible for Rent Assistance from 1 January 2008. Prior to 1 January 2008, Rent Assistance was not payable with Austudy. Like most Centrelink payments, Austudy Payments are subject to a personal and/or partner income and assets test.

==== ABSTUDY ====
ABSTUDY (The Aboriginal and Torres Strait Islander Study Assistance Scheme) is a welfare payment for Indigenous Australians undergoing some form of study. All Indigenous students at secondary or tertiary institutions, as well as those studying by correspondence, and primary students who turned 14 prior to 1 January of their current year of study. To qualify as Indigenous, a student must be of Aboriginal or Torres Strait Islander descent by Centrelink standards and be a current Australian citizen. ABSTUDY is tailored according to income tests, and the status of partners, guardians, and dependent children.

Whilst this payment is administered through Centrelink, the payment is made under ABSTUDY Policy. The responsibility for ABSTUDY Policy rests with the Minister of Education and the Department of Education, and is not contained within the Social Security Act 1991.

==== Disability Support Pension ====
The Disability Support Pension (DSP) provides income support for people who suffer a long-term disability, which in the opinion of an assessor they will not recover from in the next two years, and which will render them unable to work or participate in a training activity enabling them to work. The basic rate for a single person is A$1,079.70 (as at December 2025); different rates apply to persons under 18 with no children, and to couples, married, de facto or in a same-sex relationship. The payment is income and assets-tested. However, if an applicant is permanently blind, they can receive DSP without income and assets tests, and without needing to prove any inability to work, etc. DSP can take a while to process, so as a temporary measure claimants are placed on another payment (e.g. Newstart with a medical certificate to cover the activity tests) while the payment is being assessed; once granted it is backdated to the claim date at the higher DSP rate.

In the 2011 Australian federal budget, there were changes introduced to the Disability Support Pension, including that people under the age of 35 would be placed onto the Newstart Allowance for the first 18 months. Furthermore, the eligibility criteria for the DSP became more strict under the Gillard government.

Patrick McClure was in January 2014 appointed by the Abbott government to a review targeting benefits on people in receipt of Newstart Allowance and the Disability Support Pension, reporting in February 2014. Eligibility criteria for the DSP has been made more strict, and unsuccessful claimants can only receive the Newstart Allowance, which pays $170 less per week. According to the Australian Council of Social Service (ACOSS), between 2010 and 2016 there was a large drop in successful claims to the DSP. To be eligible for the DSP, a person's condition must be "fully diagnosed, fully treated and fully stabilised", which has had the unintended consequence of making it harder for cancer patients to access the DSP – unless their condition is terminal.

==== Sickness Allowance ====
A Sickness Allowance was paid for those currently suffering an illness, injury, or disability (short-term i.e. less than two years), are employed, and have no access to leave or have used all their leave. It was paid under the Newstart system without an Activity Test. Sickness Allowance was equal to the Newstart Allowance but only one of these payments can be claimed (you don't get both). In order to be granted a Sickness Allowance you had to be registered with Centrelink, which includes reporting your earned income each fortnight through your myGov account. You automatically ceased being eligible for either payment if your earned income exceeds the allowance-rate over three consecutive fortnightly reporting periods. Once ineligible you become subject to a waiting period before being paid any applicable welfare payment (whether it be Newstart or Sickness, or any other payment). This waiting period, known as the exclusion period was generally six weeks however can be up to ten weeks in which you will have to survive on your own, without any government benefits. This waiting/exclusion period was not backdated, so any payment approved by Centrelink will start only once the exclusion period is exhausted.

==== Carer Payment ====
A Carer Payment is made to those providing a level of care to someone who is ill, injured or has a disability. A medical certificate and other supporting documentation is required. Centrelink does not offer any related services for Carers, nor does it provide any other support or welfare follow-up, nor does it carry out any process to ensure, or validate, actual service delivery. Carers are wholly responsible for their caring duties which is negotiated between the Carer and Caree' on an individual and personal-needs basis.

==== Parenting Payment ====
A payment for those who are principal carers of dependent children under the age of 6 for partnered customers and children under the age of 14 (previously 8) for single customers. Parenting Payment Partnered is classified as an allowance and Parenting Payment Single is classified as a pension.

A controversial decision by the Labor party in 2006 and 2013, to transfer sole parents to the lower Newstart payment, has placed sole parents well below the poverty line. Welfare groups have reported these parents, 82.3% of whom are women (ABS 2011), are turning to prostitution (because of the cash in hand options), have given up their education and are sleeping in their cars. This decision was made as an incentive for parents to seek work, as 57% of primary residential mothers work and 70% of primary residential fathers work (ABS 2011). One quarter of single parent households are headed by a single parent, being 896,542 families (17.7% male & 82.3% female, ABS 2011).

Parenting Payment Partnered uses an individual and a partner income test to determine the rate of payment with benefit withdrawal rates of 60 cents in the dollar (as of 1 July 2007) on income over the legislated limits. A partner's gross earnings are assessed as shared, regardless of individual tax already paid. If, for example, the breadwinner is currently paying 30 per cent personal tax, the effective marginal tax rate (EMTR) after benefit withdrawal is 90 percent of earnings above the legislated limit (the EMTR prior to 1 July 2007 is 100% as the benefit withdrawal rate is 70% of the partner's earnings above the legislated income limit).

=== Additional and supplementary payments ===
==== Rent Assistance ====
Income support recipients who are classed as non-homeowners and pay more than a required amount of board or rent for accommodation are eligible for Rent Assistance payments. This payment is paid as part of the income support payment. Verification of the rent details is required, either a lease or by completing a Rent Certificate every six months. The amount of rent assistance a recipient is eligible for depends on the amount of rent one is paying. The basic rate for a single person with no children and not sharing accommodation is as follows. As at 28 January 2010, Rent Assistance begins to be paid when a renter's fortnightly rent is in excess of A$99.40. For every dollar in excess of this amount, Rent Assistance pays A$0.75, up to a maximum of A$111.80 per fortnight. The maximum amount payable is lower for those sharing accommodation, in which case it is A$74.53. Different rates apply to couples, couples separated by illness, couples temporarily separated and singles and couples with dependent children. An example of an income support payment is the Newstart Allowance which comprises a base rate plus rent assistance. An "income support payment" is an umbrella term (or classification of payment) which is sometimes used instead of detailing the name of the particular payment. It does not represent a payment of its own but could mean any one of Centrelink's welfare payments, e.g. the Newstart Allowance is an income support payment.

==== Pharmaceutical Allowance ====
A payment of A$6.00 per fortnight for those receiving certain Centrelink payments, to help cover the cost of prescription medicines. The amount covers the cost of one prescription per fortnight for a concession card holder eligible for the concessional rate of medicines (A$5.90 per script from 1 January 2013). This payment is only given if you are able to prove to Centrelink that you require prescribed medication. A Centrelink Medical Certificate can be obtained online from my.gov.au or from a branch, which will need to be filled out by a registered medical professional and then submitted to Centrelink for consideration. This allowance can drop-off on its own so recipients must call Centrelink to notify them of this, when or if this occurs. Undercalculated payments can take one business day to correct however an underpayment is more likely to be paid in your next fortnightly pay with your regular entitlement. which are covered under the Pharmaceutical Benefits Scheme, which covers most prescription medicines available.

==== Telephone Allowance ====
A payment issued quarterly to eligible customers receiving pension payments, to help cover the cost of telephone bills. Eligible customers must have a telephone service subscribed in their name to be eligible for Telephone Allowance. There are two rates payable: a basic rate of A$23.40 and a higher rate of A$35.20. JobSeeker Recipients are not eligible.

== A New Tax System (Family Assistance) Act 1999 ==
Payments made under the A New Tax System (Family Assistance) Act 1999 include:

- Family Tax Benefit Part A – for parents or carers to help with the cost of raising children.
- Family Tax Benefit Part B – for single income families or sole parents.
- Maternity Immunisation Allowance – for fully immunised children or those exempt from immunisation
- Child Care Benefit – for families to help with the cost of child care.
- Schoolkids Bonus – for families for the cost of education for children in primary and secondary school.

=== Family Tax Benefit ===
Family Tax Benefit is a per-child payment made through Services Australia to the people with at least 35 per cent of care for a child. Family Tax Benefit is income-tested on a family's adjusted taxable income in the given financial year. Income support recipients are exempt from the income test and are entitled to the maximum rate of payment.

Payments can be paid in fortnightly instalments or as a lump sum payment at the end of the year. For Family Tax Benefit paid in instalments, the income test is based on an estimate of adjusted taxable income that is reconciled after the recipient has lodged their tax return. The reconciliation process compares the estimated income with their actual income.

- Centrelink debt is accrued for overpayments, when customers underestimate their income.
- A top-up payment is granted at the end of the year, when customers overestimate their income which can be used to repay outstanding Centrelink debt.

Childless persons, or non-parents, are not entitled to the Family Tax Benefit payments.

Family Tax Benefit Part B is paid based on the lower of the recipient and their partner's income, or, for a single parent at the maximum rate.

=== Maternity Immunisation Allowance ===
Maternity Immunisation Allowance is paid to parents whose children who have received all immunisations specified by the national immunisation schedule by the time they are 2 years old. Alternatively, if the parents object to immunisation on any grounds and inform Centrelink of this, they may also receive this allowance. The allowance ceased on 1 July 2012.

=== Child Care Benefit ===
Child Care Benefit assists Australian parents with the cost of approved and registered child care. It is a means tested payment and is based on the recipient's taxable income; low income families receive the highest rate of Child Care Benefit.

The Australian Government spent approximately $2.1 billion on Child Care Benefit to assist families with the cost of child care in the financial year ending 30 June 2011.

=== Schoolkids Bonus ===
In May 2012, the Australian Government abolished the Education Tax Refund (ETR) that allowed families to claim a refund for education expenses through the Australian Taxation Office (ATO). The Schoolkids Bonus replaced the ETR from 1 January 2013. The Schoolkids Bonus aimed to assist families and students with the costs of education for children in primary and secondary school. The School Kids Bonus is paid in 2 equal instalments each year in January and July.

== Paid Parental Leave Scheme ==
The Paid Parental Leave Scheme provides financial support to eligible working parents of newborn or recently adopted children. Under the scheme, the government funds employers to provide Parental Leave Pay or Dad and Partner Pay to their eligible employees.

Parental Leave Pay is paid to the child's primary carer and eligible parents for up to 18 weeks of pay based on the rate of National Minimum Wage. Dad and Partner Pay is for eligible working dads or partners (including adopting parents and same-sex couples) for up to two weeks of pay based on the rate of National Minimum Wage.

This scheme does not apply to casual employees who do not have paid leave entitlements. Women who are engaged in casual rate employment who are ineligible for paid maternity leave and who are unable to continue employment due to pregnancy are not entitled to the Paid Parental Leave Scheme. Unemployed pregnant women may be eligible to apply for an income support payment however normal eligibility criteria applies.

== Concession cards ==
The following concession cards are issued by Centrelink:

- Health Care Card – primarily entitles holder to PBS medications at the concession rate. This green paper card is the basic and most common Health Care Card which is sent to a recipient of a payment by post shortly after receiving their first payment and then each year before expiry, if still eligible. This card is given to those not eligible for a Commonwealth Seniors Concession, or Pensioner Concession Card. This card has secondary benefits, including cheaper public transport in some states, upon application. In order to gain a transport concession a separate application for concession needs to be made to the Department of Planning, Transport and Infrastructure and if successful, a transport concession card will be mailed to you. Heavy fines apply for using public transport on a concession-priced ticket without holding a valid transport concession card. A general Health Care Card does not entitle the bearer to transport concessions. Only Pensioner and Commonwealth Seniors Concession Card holders can apply for a transport concession card.
- Commonwealth Seniors Health Card – a HCC issued to senior citizens.
- Pensioner Concession Card – this offers additional benefits to the Pensioner, including pensioner transportation fares (in some areas), and a certain number of free country rail journeys within the holder's state. Pensioners can enjoy discounted postal services including discounted stamps, and a whole range of discounted services including discounted cinema tickets, discounted meals when dining out, discounted hair cuts and discounts on all utility and home service costs.

== Prisons and psychiatric hospitals ==
Persons imprisoned or admitted to a psychiatric institution are generally not eligible to receive benefits for the duration of imprisonment or admission. (However, it may be payable if a psychiatric stay is classed as rehabilitation.) The benefits resume upon release or discharge. However, upon release or discharge from imprisonment or psychiatric hospitalisation of more than two weeks, the claimant is entitled to an additional payment equal to seven days of their regular payment, to help with adjustment.

== Review of social security decisions ==
Every decision made under social security law is to be in writing and given sufficient notice, usually in a letter. Applications for review of such decisions may be lodged at any time, but depending on the decision remedial action may only be taken if the review is received within 13 weeks of receiving notice, for decisions made under the Social Security act, or 52 weeks for decisions made under Family assistance law. At the bottom of each letter informing customers of a Centrelink decision, a "your rights" box informs individuals of potential avenues for review.

=== Internal review ===
Legislation ultimately governs the decision-making process, and Centrelink policy guidelines provide the lens through which legislation is interpreted by Centrelink Customer Service Advisers (CSAs). However, notwithstanding legislation and policy, there are still many areas in which significant discretion is afforded to the decision maker, which may be subject to internal and external review.

==== Original decision maker (ODM) review ====
Centrelink possesses a prescribed two-tiered system of internal review. The initial stage is the ODM Review, where the matter is brought back to the CSA for reconsideration. This is a wholly intra-office process and functions as an initial check on the decision, and the appeal progresses further from the ODM only if necessary. Many reviews are due to legislative changes, administrative errors, provision of new customer documentation, or customer disagreement with the decision. There is also the opportunity for the customer to make a formal written complaint. However, many individuals may not wish to have the same CSA make another decision, which may even lead to confusion as to whether internal review has actually taken place.

Once the ODM review has been completed it should contain the relevant legislative provisions, any new information considered, and a determination stating whether the original decision has been set aside, affirmed or varied.

==== Authorised review officer (ARO) review ====
If the individual is not satisfied, an Authorised Review Officer (ARO), an officer delegated review powers from the Secretary for the purposes of social security law, may affirm, vary, or set aside the original decision. Although an employee of the Centrelink, an ARO is not to defend ODM decisions as it is a strong principle that the ARO is independent of the situation and has no previous involvement in the case. Nevertheless, AROs also look at legislation with the same policy guidelines as CSAs.

=== External review ===
==== The Social Security Appeals Tribunal – SSAT ====
A customer dissatisfied with an internal review of a decision may apply to the Social Security Appeals Tribunal (SSAT) to review a decision affirmed, varied or set aside by internal review, subject to some exceptions. The SSAT generally has the same powers as the Secretary, and may affirm, vary, set aside and substitute a decision or return the matter to Centrelink with recommendations. SSAT hearings are generally informal, confidential and not bound by the Laws of Evidence.

Experience has indicated that at the SSAT more weighting goes towards the legislation as opposed to policy guidelines. Welfare advocacy groups such as the Welfare Rights Centre are often involved in providing legal help to individuals affected by Centrelink decisions. There is no Welfare Rights Centre in South Australia so complaints are to be raised with Centrelink directly.

As of 1 July 2015, the SSAT is no longer is a separate tribunal. Alongside the Migration Review Tribunal and the Refugee Review Tribunal, the SSAT has instead merged with the Administrative Appeals Tribunal (AAT). Decisions deemed reviewable by the ARO are now heard in the Social Services and Child Support Division of the AAT. The primary functions of the SSAT as the first tier of the review process have been converted and are now known as the 'AAT first review'. Therefore, the traditional two-tier review process has morphed in light of the amalgamation but it has nevertheless been preserved within the AAT.

2019, SACAT South Australian Civil Administrative Tribunal deals with rental properties and issues between renters and landlords and agents, as well as deals with various licensing matters and handles reviews of mental health treatment orders including investigating and revoking involuntary psychiatric confinement orders, commonly enforced by the authoritarian Government.

==== The AAT and the courts ====
A decision may be reviewed by the AAT on AAT "first review", after which it can be reviewed again on AAT "second review" if an applicant is unhappy after the first review. Further appeals (on questions of law only) are available to the Federal Court and High Court.

==== The Ombudsman ====
The Commonwealth Ombudsman does not conduct a merits review (as would the ARO, SSAT or AAT), but considers the administrative decision-making process employed by Centrelink to reach the decision or carry out the action complained of.

Where the Ombudsman concludes that there has been a deficiency in Centrelink's action (for examples) the Ombudsman may make recommendations to Centrelink for remedial action. This may result in Centrelink changing their decision, or providing a better explanation of their decision.

Investigations by the Ombudsman are usually result from a complaint about a decision or action of Centrelink, and in the process of an investigation the Ombudsman is entitled to view Centrelink records and ask questions of Centrelink staff. While the Ombudsman does not have coercive powers to make Centrelink change a decision or act in a certain way, recommendations made by the Ombudsman are rarely rejected.

== See also ==
- Cashless Welfare Card
- Welfare
- Social safety net
- The Susso – slang for welfare in the Great Depression.
- Welfare reform
- Unemployment benefits
