= AUSTUDY Scheme =

Australian educational assistance scheme

The AUSTUDY scheme was an Australian educational assistance scheme that provided financial assistance to eligible students aged 16 and over. The program commenced on 1 January 1987 and ceased on 30 June 1998.

== History ==
=== Commencement ===
Upon commencement on 1 January 1987, AUSTUDY replaced the Tertiary Education Assistance Scheme (TEAS) which was introduced by the Whitlam government in 1973 for students enrolled at university or other tertiary education institutions, and Adult Secondary Education Assistance Scheme (ASEAS) and Secondary Allowances Scheme (SAS) for those who needed financial assistance while enrolled at high school.

AUSTUDY was administered through the provisions of the Student Assistance Act 1973 and AUSTUDY Regulations.

The AUSTUDY scheme had 3 categories:

- General secondary: for students aged 16 to 19 years undertaking full-time secondary education;
- Adult secondary: for students aged 19 years and over undertaking full-time secondary education; and,
- Tertiary: for students aged 16 years and over undertaking approved full-time post-secondary courses.

In general, it provided financial assistance in the form of:

- Living allowance, which include various components for a student who is independent or lives away from home, for a dependent spouse or for a dependent child;
- Fares allowance, which assisted students living away from home with the costs of travel at vacation times between home and the educational institution; or,
- Pensioner education supplement, which assisted receivers of certain Australian Government pensions with the additional costs relating to full-time or part-time study.

=== Cessation ===
On 1 July 1998, the Australian Government introduced new provisions for this payment to be paid under the Social Security Act 1991. At the same time, the AUSTUDY scheme was renamed to Youth Allowance for 16- to 24-year-old students and Austudy Payment for students aged 25 and over. The pensioner education supplement program was retained, but its provisions were also moved to the Social Security Act 1991. The AUSTUDY Scheme was administered through various Australian Government Departments including the Department of Education, the Department of Employment, Education, Training and Youth Affairs (DEETYA), the Department of Education, Training and Youth Affairs (DETYA) and Centrelink.

== See also ==
- Austudy Payment
