= National Insurance (Australia) =

Planned social security system

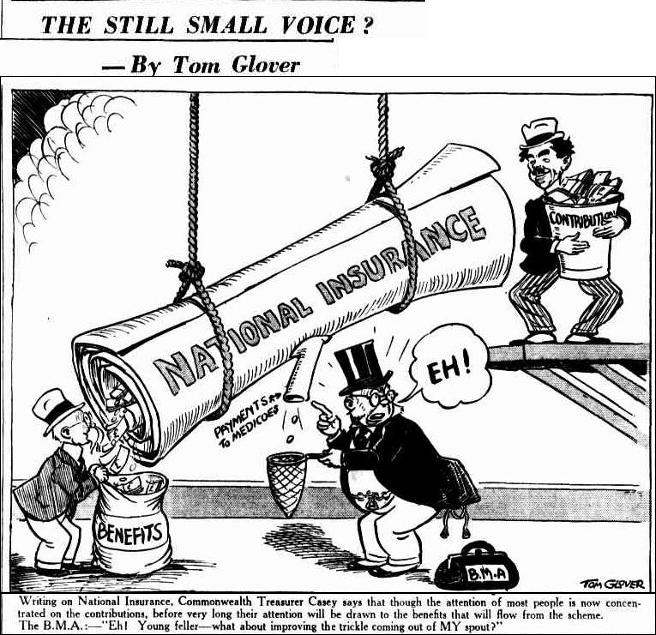
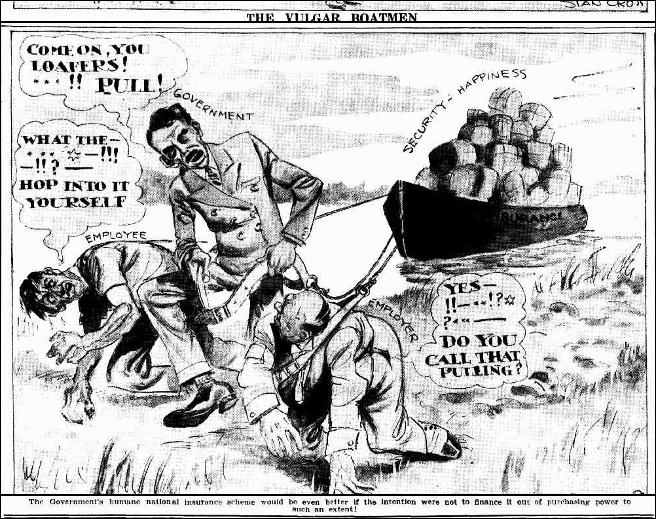
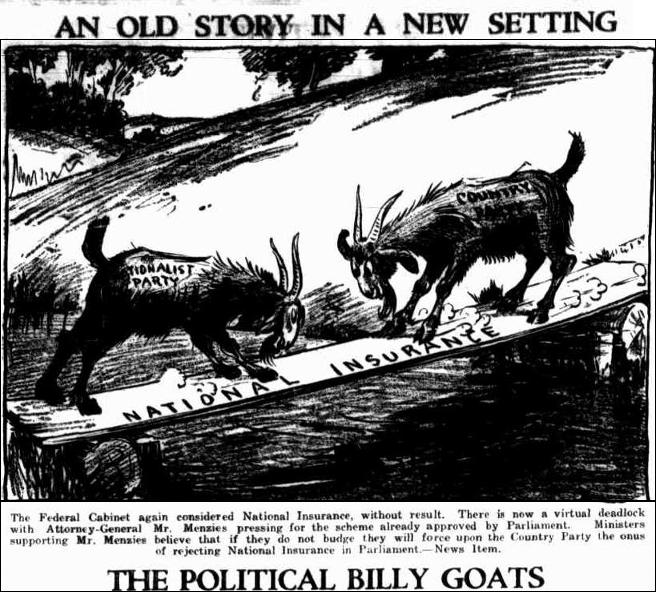

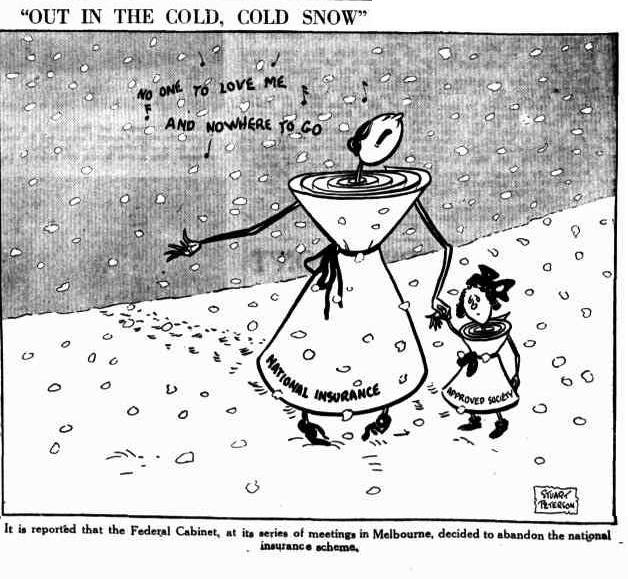
A series of contemporary cartoons depicting (1) the Lyons government's initial adoption of the scheme, (2) contemporary criticisms of the scheme, (3) conflict within the government over the scheme, and (4) the scheme's ultimate abandonment.

National Insurance was a planned system of social security in Australia which would have provided medical, disability, unemployment and pension coverage to its contributors and their dependents. The scheme was passed into law by the Lyons government as the National Health and Pensions Insurance Act 1938, but was abandoned the following year in order to divert funds to defence.

== Background ==
There were few serious proposals for a comprehensive social insurance scheme in Australia before World War I, as it was seen as unfeasible. In 1911, deputy opposition leader Joseph Cook told federal parliament that "the more I think of it the more convinced I am that we must come ultimately to a form of national insurance which will give every man–the millionaire as well as the poor man–who has subscribed to his own insurance fund the right to receive that insurance, without taint of pauperism or charity, in his old age".

Advocates of greater federal government involvement in healthcare were divided between those who supported centralised public health services providing universal healthcare and those who supported contributory insurance-based schemes.

== Bruce–Page government ==
At the 1922 federal election, the Country Party's platform included plans for a national insurance scheme covering "sickness, unemployment, poverty and age". After the election the party's leader Earle Page, a trained surgeon and strong supporter of the scheme, entered into a coalition with the Nationalist Party under S. M. Bruce, who became prime minister. In 1923, the new government announced plans for a comprehensive social services system that would "remove altogether the taint of pauperism". It subsequently established the Royal Commission on National Insurance under the chairmanship of Nationalist senator John Millen, which ran from 7 September 1923 to 5 October 1927.

=== 1928 bill ===
In September 1928, Page introduced the National Insurance Bill into the House of Representatives, which "provided for sickness, old age, disability and maternity benefits, mainly paid for by compulsory contributions by workers and employers, along with smaller payments to parents of children under 16 and to orphans". The legislation failed to pass before the 1928 federal election, although the government heavily promoted the scheme during the election campaign. The scheme was postponed indefinitely the following year, prior to the government's parliamentary defeat on a no-confidence motion and defeat at an early election.

== 1938 act ==
National Health and Pensions Insurance Act 1938

Parliament of Australia
- Long title: An Act to provide for Insurance against certain Contingencies affecting Employees, and the Wives, Children, Widows, and Orphans of Employees, and for other purposes.
- Assented to: 5 July 1938
- Repealed: 1 July 1947
- Introduced by: Lyons government
- Status: Repealed

The Lyons government, a coalition between the United Australia Party and Australian Country Party, was re-elected at the 1937 federal election on a platform which included a national insurance scheme covering both old-age pensions and healthcare. The strongest advocates of national insurance within the UAP were treasurer Richard Casey and former minister Frederick Stewart, while Prime Minister Joseph Lyons was lukewarm towards the idea and many Country MPs were hostile.

=== Drafting and provisions ===
The government's legislation was largely modelled on its British equivalents and was drafted by British civil servants. However, unlike in the UK, administrative control over the scheme was to be vested in a National Insurance Commission. Its final form was largely due to financial considerations, with the legislation required the scheme to become self-financing as soon as possible. It ultimately included contributory schemes for sickness and disability, old-age pensions, payments for widows and orphans, and child endowment. Many specialist medical services were excluded from the scheme, including anaesthesia, pathology, x-rays, venereal diseases, abortions, miscarriages and stillbirths. The health and pension insurance components (known as the Kinnear scheme after their author) were to be enacted separately to the unemployment insurance component.

Although the Australian branches of the British Medical Association (BMA) were largely in favour of a contributory health insurance scheme, the medical profession ultimately came into conflict with the government over the scheme. The initial conflict was over the size of the capitation fees payable to doctors, with general practitioners claiming they would have to increase their workload in order to maintain their income.

One provision of the act excluded Indigenous Australian workers in remote areas from contribution requirements "where collecting contributions was deemed impracticable".

=== Enactment ===
The National Health and Pensions Insurance Bill was introduced to parliament on 4 May 1938. The government sought to insurance swift passage of the legislation, as it had suffered losses in the Senate at the previous election and wished to ensure passage before new opposition senators were seated on 1 July. Dissident Country MPs, led by Hubert Lawrence Anthony and Arthur Fadden, secured several concessions.

== Aftermath ==
In 1944, Richard Casey wrote to General Archibald Wavell defending the substance of the scheme and stating that it was inevitable that it would be revived after the war. He stated "it will be my bill and my scheme – and no argument and no playing-of-politics can gainsay that". Casey told journalist Jack Hetherington in 1964 that the decision to abandon the scheme was made “largely at Mr Lyons’ instigation, by reason of his belief that [...] we could not finance it”. However, he wrote to Fred Daly in 1956 that “on my own personal initiative, I recommended to Cabinet the withdrawal of the legislation [...] for reasons that were connected with the quite obvious on-coming war”. Menzies recalled in later years that Casey had recommended to cabinet that the scheme be dropped to avoid political controversy.

== See also ==
- Social Security Act 1938 (New Zealand)

== Bibliography ==
- Gillespie, James (1991). The Price of Health: Australian Governments and Medical Politics 1910-1960. Cambridge: Cambridge University Press. ISBN 9780521523226. OCLC 49638492.
- National Insurance: A Summary of the Principles of the Australian National Health and Pensions Insurance Act 1938. National Insurance Commission. 1938.
