= 2016 Australian federal budget =

Australian federal budget 2016
- Submitted: 3 May 2016
- Submitted by: Turnbull government
- Submitted to: House of Representatives
- Country: Australia
- Parliament: 44th
- Party: Liberal/National Coalition
- Treasurer: Scott Morrison
- Total revenue: $415.7 billion
- Program spending: $447.8 billion
- Deficit: A$33.2 billion
- Debt: $322.3 billion (net debt) (18.4% of GDP)
- Website: budget.gov.au

The 2016 Australian federal budget was the federal budget to fund government services and operations for the 2016–17 financial year. It was presented to the House of Representatives by Treasurer Scott Morrison on 3 May 2016. It was the third budget to be handed down by the Liberal/National Coalition since their election to government at the 2013 federal election, and the first to be handed down by Morrison as Treasurer and the Turnbull government.

Breaking from convention, the budget was submitted a week earlier than the traditional annual date of the second Tuesday in May, amidst a run-up to the 2016 federal election. Prime Minister Malcolm Turnbull had recalled parliament early, in anticipation of a double dissolution triggering an election for 2 July 2016.

== Background ==
In September 2015, Member for Wentworth and Minister for Communications under the Abbott government, Malcolm Turnbull, challenged the incumbent Tony Abbott for the Prime Ministership and won office by a vote of the Liberal Party caucus. He challenged Abbott on a rationale of "economic leadership", criticising his economic policies and claiming that he had "not been capable of providing the economic leadership our nation needs of providing the economic confidence that business needs." After ascending to the Prime Ministership, Turnbull appointed the former Minister for Social Services Scott Morrison as Treasurer, replacing Joe Hockey who resigned from politics shortly afterwards.

== Forecasts ==
For the 2016–17 financial year, the government forecast a deficit of $37.1 billion, which is $2.7 billion less than the estimated $39.8 billion deficit during the 2015–16 financial year.

== Taxes and income ==
=== Income and business taxes ===
The individual tax rates remained the same except that the $80,000 upper threshold for the 32.5% rate was increased to $87,000 effective 1 July 2016. The 2% deficit repair levy on individual incomes above $180,000 instituted by former Prime Minister Tony Abbott is set to be abolished from 1 July 2017.

The small to medium business tax rate will also be lowered once again, by 1% to 27.5%, effective 1 July 2016. The turnover threshold in which small businesses would be eligible for this lower tax rate will be raised significantly, from $2 million to $10 million, with the expectation that it will once again be raised to $25 million in 2017–18, $50 million in 2018–19, and eventually $100 million in 2019–20. It is expected this tax cut will affect over 870,000 businesses, employing 3.4 million workers. Over 6,000 Sole traders, employing 1.5 million workers, will also receive a lower tax cut of 2.5% to 26.0%, subject to the same turnover threshold eligibility as small businesses and along with the same increase in turnover threshold over time. The unincorporated small business tax discount will also be increased by 3%, up to a fixed rate of 8%, with the turnover threshold being increased to $5 million. After 2016–17, it is expected that the discount for unincorporated small businesses will increase to 16% by stages, before the 2026-27 financial year. In the forecast for the budget, Big businesses will receive a 5% cut to the corporate income tax rate, down to the OECD average of 25%, within a decade; the first reduction in the corporate tax rate in 15 years. While the rate will stay fixed at 30% in the meantime, the Turnbull government plans to reduce it to a rate equal to the small and medium business tax rate of 27.5% in 2023-24, before being reduced to 27% in 2024-25, 26% in 2025-26, and eventually a fixed rate of 25% in 2026-27.

=== Superannuation ===
The budget made changes to the superannuation arrangements and thresholds.

== Programs and expenditure ==
=== Aged care ===
The government changed the scoring of the Aged Care Funding Instrument, which allocates the government subsidy per person in aged care, by assessing their care needs. There was some additional funding for regional aged care facilities, but the net effect of the budget is "a reduction of $902.7 million over five years".

=== Social security ===
In the 2016 budget, the Turnbull government planned to cease the clean energy supplement of $4.40 for people beginning Newstart after 20 September.

=== Infrastructure ===
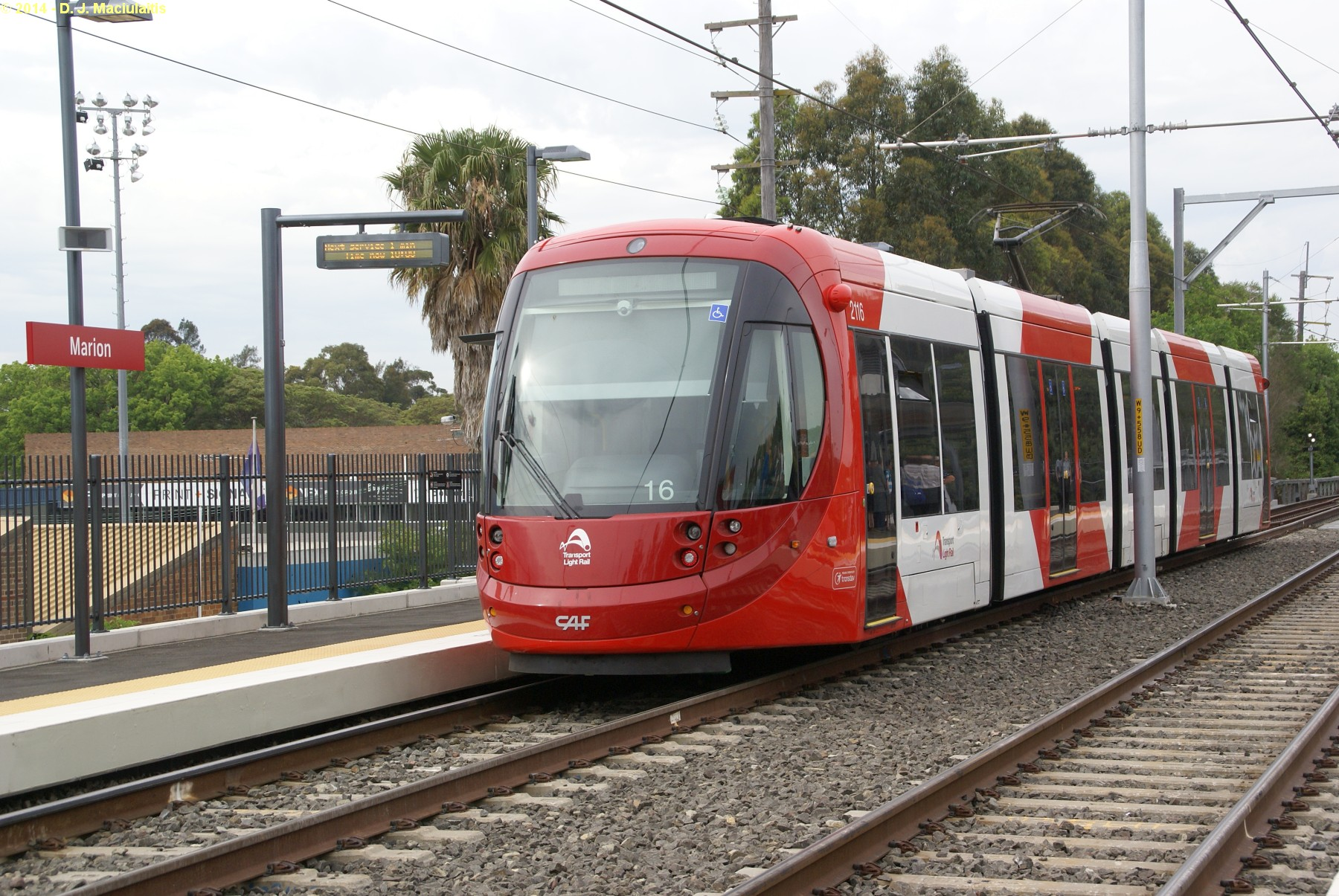
Public transport projects, such as the Parramatta Light Rail, were given more focus over road projects – a notable contrast from Abbott government budgets.

Over $33 billion will be spent to deliver "critical and innovative" infrastructure, including road and rail upgrades. Out of this infrastructure fund, $115 million will be pledged towards the construction of the Western Sydney Airport at Badgerys Creek over two years, with $89 million dedicated towards planning, development, land acquisitions and construction security, and $26.2 million dedicated towards design research for a proposed extension of the South West Rail Link towards Badgerys Creek. It will be the only ongoing infrastructure project in Sydney to see an increase in funding from the previous federal budget. In total, $2.9 billion will be spent on infrastructure in New South Wales, including $1.7 billion towards construction of the Sydney Metro's extension into the city and southwest, and $78.3 million towards design and development of the Parramatta Light Rail. In Melbourne, $3 billion is still available for the Government of Victoria to spend on the proposed East West Link, which had been previously accepted by former Liberal Premier Denis Napthine, but rejected by Labor Premier Daniel Andrews after his election in 2014, who vowed instead to fund and construct the Melbourne Metro Rail Project, without federal support. Despite this, it was recommended to the Victorian Government that federal support of $857.2 million be spent on the Melbourne Metro, in addition to $20.2 million for the Murray Basin Rail project, taken from the Federal Government's Asset Recycling Initiative.

The $4 billion sale of the Australian Rail Track Corporation, proposed by the preceding Abbott government, was completely dropped by the Turnbull government, in favor of developing and constructing the long-proposed inland rail line linking Melbourne and Brisbane. $594 million will be spent towards research and land acquisition, though there is no funding as of yet for construction of the line, which is projected to cost around $10.7 billion. The Federal Government will also allocate over $2 billion to the establishment of the National Water Infrastructure Loans Facility, which will allow concessional loans to state and territory governments, helping to fund the construction of dams, pipelines, and groundwater recharge projects from July 2016. The new bank will replace the National Water Infrastructure Development Fund, which was established in 2015, and allocated only $500 million. The National Water Infrastructure Loans Facility will exist for 10 years, and State and Territory governments will have a deadline of 25 years to repay money taken from the fund. Minister for Agriculture and Water Resources Barnaby Joyce stated that funding proposals for over 60 water infrastructure projects had been received by the federal government at the time of the budget's release.

=== Employment ===
$751.7 million will be dedicated to funding a new workfare program targeted at unemployed youth under 25, known as the Youth Jobs PaTH scheme. It is an alternative for the "work for the dole" scheme introduced by the Abbott government in the previous budget. Slated to commence on 1 April 2017 and aiming to engage over 30,000 young jobseekers, the program will feature three stages; the first stage being an intensive pre-employment skills training course, five months after job seekers register with the Department of Employment's "jobactive" service. The second stage with see job seekers introduced into the workplace through at least 120,000 four to twelve-week internships provided in cooperation with jobactive and participating businesses, where businesses will receive an upfront payment of $1000 for each intern they take on, and interns will be paid an additional $200 a fortnight, on top of their income support payments. In the third and final stage, businesses who hire participants as employees will be given a wage subsidy of $10,000 for hiring "less than job ready" seekers and $6,500 for more job ready seekers, billed as the "Youth Bonus wage subsidy". To fund the program, $500 million will be axed from the work for the dole scheme, in addition to the $240 million Job Commitment Bonus. Furthermore, as of October 2016, "the most prepared job seekers" will now require at least 12 months of registration with jobactive for work for the dole, instead of the six months required before the change, forecast to save $494.2 million over four years.

== Reception ==
The budget received mixed reactions from various sections of the community. The Australian Broadcasting Corporation produced two extensive publications − Budget 2016: Winners and losers and Budget 2016 cheat sheet: What you need to know.
