= Youth Jobs PaTH =

Defunct Australian youth employment program

Youth Jobs PaTH was a youth employment program that operated in Australia between 2017 and 2022. The program served as a partial replacement for the Work for the Dole scheme and provided job training and voluntary work experience placements of between four and twelve weeks for unemployed young people. The goal of the program was for unemployed young people to move through the three stage of Prepare, Trial and Hire (PaTH) — they would first undertake skills training, then would be taken on by a host business for an internship of between four and twelve weeks, and then would find paid employment, either with their internship host or with another employer using the skills and experience they had acquired during their internship. The Turnbull government announced the scheme in the 2016–17 Budget and committed $751.7 million to the program over four years. The scheme was scrapped by the Albanese government after the Australian Labor Party came to power in the 2022 election.

The scheme had some success, with roughly half of participants finding a job within three months of the end of their internship placement. But the program consistently fell well short of participation targets. The scheme resulted in 12,741 internship placements between 2017 and 2022, well short of its original goal of 120,000. The PaTH program also faced persistent criticism for paying interns less than minimum wage and for potentially displacing ordinary entry-level workers.

== History ==
Youth Jobs PaTH was announced by the Turnbull government in the 2016–17 Budget with a commitment of $751.7 million over four years. The scheme was a partial replacement for the controversial Work for the Dole scheme, which had undergone a number of iterations since its inception in 1998. Unemployed young people aged between 15 and 24 who had mutual obligation requirements and were receiving an income support payment such as Youth Allowance or Newstart were eligible to participate in the PaTH program.

The scheme had three components. The first was Employability Skills Training, which provided up to six weeks of skills training to unemployed young people receiving a welfare payment. The second was voluntary internships of 15–25 hours per week for 4–12 weeks with a host business. During this internship, which was open to jobseekers aged 17 to 24, participants would receive an additional $200 per fortnight on top of their regular welfare payments, and the host business would receive a $1000 incentive payment. The intent of the program was that if the placement had been successful, the host business would then hire the young person on an ongoing basis. The third component was a Youth Bonus Wage Subsidy of between $6500 and $10,000 for businesses that offered an eligible unemployed young person an ongoing job for an average of 20 hours per week or more for at least 6 months.

The scheme was strongly criticised by the Australian Labor Party, the Greens and the Australian Council of Trade Unions. The ACTU expressed concerns that, in addition to doing little to address youth unemployment, the scheme would crowd out "real" jobs. The Australian Council of Social Services, however, welcomed the new program as an improvement on the Work for the Dole scheme. The Business Council of Australia, the Australian Industry Group and the Council of Small Businesses of Australia expressed support for the scheme.

From its inception, the program struggled to meet participation targets for the internship component of the scheme. Despite a target of 30,000 placements in its first year, only 4785 internships were completed in the first 18 months of operation. In October 2018, only 3645 businesses had signed up to participate, short of a target of 18,000-20,000. The government spent $2.52 million advertising the scheme in the 2017–18 financial year but had little success in meeting its participation targets. Despite its struggles to meet these participation targets for the internship component of the scheme, the government defended the program, with Minister for Jobs Kelly O'Dwyer pointing out that more than 59,000 young people had participated in at least one element of the scheme by December 2018, and that 64.5% of them had found a job.

Top job categories for PaTH interns as of December 2018
Job category	Number of interns
Cafe workers	968
Sales assistants	926
Kitchenhands	401
Clerical and administrative workers	368
Labourers	336
Food trades assistants	291
Bar assistants and baristas	249
Fast food cooks	227
Clerical and office support workers	223
Receptionists	216
Housekeepers	214
Waiters	196

Only about 1% of participants in the scheme followed the linear Prepare-Trial-Hire pathway involving employability training, followed by an internship, followed by a job placement. Many participants only participated in one or two of the elements of the scheme, with the majority accessing only the Youth Bonus Wage Subsidy or the Employability Skills Training. About half of participants who completed an internship placement found a job within three months of the end of their internship, with at least 39% of participants who completed an internship being employed with their host business. But an evaluation of the scheme found that only about 14% of these job placements following a PaTH internship represented 'new' jobs, where a jobseeker was hired for a vacancy that would not otherwise exist if not for their participation in the PaTH scheme. The remainder represented substitution and deadweight effects, where the vacancy would have been filled regardless (55%), or where the jobseeker would have been hired for the role as a regular applicant regardless of their participation in PaTH (30%).

As of 2019, the top five employers using the program were Coles, Woolworths, Chemist Warehouse, AHS Hospitality and Hog's Breath Cafe. The top job categories for participants were as cafe workers, sales assistants and kitchenhands. 29% of internships were in accommodation and food services, 20% were in retail trade, and 17% were in other services.

The Australian Labor Party opposition had opposed the program since its inception and committed to scrapping it if elected at both the 2019 and 2022 federal elections. After winning power in 2022, the Albanese government announced that the program would cease on 1 October 2022.

== Criticism ==
The scheme was widely criticised for requiring young people to act as "unpaid labour". Participants did not receive a salary from their host organisation during their internship, instead receiving a $200 per fortnight incentive on top of their regular welfare payment. With internships being for up to 50 hours per fortnight, this meant that participants were 'paid' as little as $4 per hour. Employment Minister Michaelia Cash called the claim that workers were paid $4 per hour "a blatant lie", pointing out that this payment was in addition to participants' existing welfare payments. Others criticised instances of poor working conditions, with some participants reporting sexual harassment and unsafe conditions, and 33 participants suffering workplace injuries during their internships.

Providers were required to confirm that a host business had a "reasonable prospect" of offering the young person a job at the completion of their internship. But host businesses were not required to hire participants. One host business was made ineligible for the program after taking on 17 interns without offering any of them a job. An evaluation of the program found that, in cases where a host business did not offer a participant a job at the completion of their internship, 42% of the time this was due to the intern being unsuitable, 29% of the time this was due to the intern leaving or quitting, and 17% of the time this was due to the business being unable to offer them a job.

Unions also criticised the scheme for potentially displacing regular workers. Providers were required to ensure that host businesses were not using PaTH participants to replace ordinary workers. But the Australian Council of Trade Unions claimed after the announcement of the scheme that it would "replace existing entry-level jobs". Hungry Jack's was criticised in late 2018 for advertising for PaTH interns over the Christmas period, with the Retail and Fast Food Workers Union alleging that Hungry Jack's was using the scheme to replace their Christmas casual workforce, which would otherwise be made up of regular, paid temporary workers. In the 2018 PaTH Host Business Survey, 7% of employers reported that there had been displacement of their existing workers during the internship.
