= Patrick McClure =

Australian executive (born 1949)

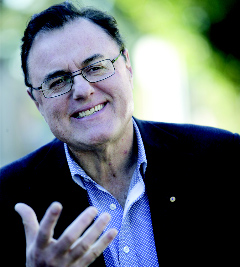
- Born: 18 March 1949 (age 77); Auckland, New Zealand
- Occupations: Chief Executive Officer, consultant to government on social policy, company director

Patrick Joseph McClure, AO (born 18 March 1949) is an Australian executive who advises governments on welfare reform, social policy, charity regulation and impact investment. He is a company director and a former chief executive officer of Mission Australia and the Society of Saint Vincent de Paul (NSW/ACT).

== Education and early career ==
McClure was born in Auckland, New Zealand and migrated with his family to Australia at age 14. He commenced his secondary education at St Peter's College, Auckland and completed it at Waverley College, Sydney. In 1968, he joined the Franciscans (Order of Friars Minor), was ordained a priest in 1975 and resigned from the ministry in 1977. He then pursued a career in the social purpose sector.

He was a director of Amnesty International (1978–1988), working with refugees and coordinating global campaigns against human rights abuses. He was founder and chair of Second Harvest (Australia), a social enterprise providing low cost food to people on low income (1978–1989), and awarded a Churchill Fellowship (1989) to study social enterprises in the US, Canada and the UK.

He worked as director of Migrant Services and area manager, Social Work, in the Department of Social Security in Perth and Sydney (1985–1991).

McClure has a Master of Arts (Public Policy) from Murdoch University, WA (1987–1991), and a Bachelor of Social Work (Distinction) from Curtin University, WA (1978–1981). He also has a Diploma in Theological and Pastoral Studies from Yarra Theological Union, Vic (1975).

== Career ==
McClure was CEO of the Society of St Vincent de Paul (NSW/ACT) from 1992 to 1996. During his tenure, he was also a member of the NSW Government Drought Assistance Committee, which distributed drought assistance to rural households across NSW.

Patrick McClure with President Bill Clinton at a fundraising event for Mission Australia

During McClure's tenure as CEO of Mission Australia from 1997 to 2006, the organisation grew from separate state-based entities to a national organisation providing employment, training, housing and other services to over 200,000 disadvantaged youth, adults, families and children. The organisation became a major provider of employment services in the privatised Job Network. Mission Australia was also awarded the Prime Minister's Community Business Partnership Award in 2001.

McClure was appointed chair of the Australian government's Reference Group on Welfare Reform (1999-2000). The final report, "Participation Support for a More Equitable Society" (known as the McClure Report) outlined a blueprint for welfare reform. In the 2001 Federal Budget, the Australian Government committed $1.7 billion over four years to implement recommendations of the report called Australians Working Together.

McClure was CEO of Macquarie Capital RVG from 2006 to 2008.

McClure was appointed Ethics Fellow at the Centre for Social Impact, University of New South Wales in 2008. Through workshops, conferences and articles, McClure presented applied ethics and an ethical decision-making framework for Third Sector organisations.

In December 2013, Minister for Social Services Kevin Andrews announced that McClure would chair a Reference Group on Welfare Reform. An interim report was released on 29 June 2014, followed by roundtables with 175 key stakeholders in all states and territories, consultations with 55 people on income support, 271 formal submissions and 231 online comments. The final report titled "A New System for Better Employment and Social Outcomes" was launched in Canberra on 23 February 2015 by Patrick McClure and the Minister for Social Services Scott Morrison. It proposed an integrated approach across four pillars of reform with an employment focus: a simpler and more sustainable income support system, building individual and family capacity, engaging employers, and building community capacity.

He was Chair of the Oak Tree Retirement Villages Group from 2018 to 2022.

In 2017, Assistant Minister to the Treasurer Michael Sukkar announced that McClure would chair a review of the ACNC Legislation. The final report, "Strengthening for Purpose: Australian Charities and Not-for-Profits Legislation Commission Review 2018", made 30 recommendations relating to functions, powers, governance, basic religious charities, secrecy, advocacy, criminal misconduct, harmonisation of fundraising, one-stop-shop, and a national scheme for charities. The Australian Government response in March 2020 implemented 19 of the recommendations.

He is a member of the NSW Treasury, Office of Social Impact Investment Expert Advisory Group. He is chair of the Waverley College Advisory Council. He was an adjunct professor of the Australian Catholic University (ACU). He is an associate of The Brown Collective. He is a selector for Community Services of the Churchill Trust (NSW). He was a director of the Kincare Group (2013–2018).

== Honours ==
McClure receiving the Officer of the Order of Australia from Governor Marie Bashir

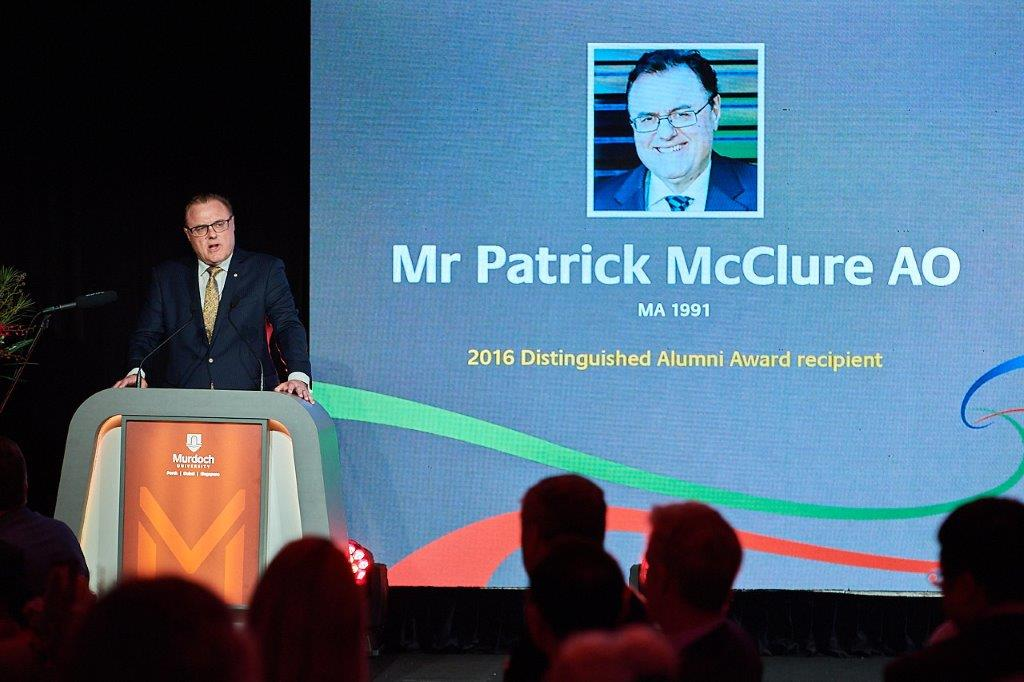
McClure receiving the 2016 Distinguished Alumni Award from Murdoch University, WA

- Churchill Fellow, 1989
- Australian Centenary of Federation Medal for "service to the community" (2001)
- Equity Trustees EQT CEO Award for Lifetime Achievement recognising "leadership excellence in the non-profit sector" (2002)
- Officer of the Order of Australia (AO) for "services to the community through the development of social capital policy initiatives, and in the delivery of programs addressing social justice, welfare support, health and employment generation issues" (2003)
- Distinguished Alumni Award, Murdoch University, WA for significant contribution to his profession and the community (2016)
