= ABSTUDY =

Australian government program

ABSTUDY is an Australian Government program that gives financial assistance to Aboriginal and Torres Strait Islander students and apprentices who are less than 24 years old through fortnightly payments.

The scheme was introduced in 1969 by the Liberal–National Gorton Government, as part of a commitment to assist Aboriginal and Torres Strait Islander people to attain better educational, social and economic outcomes, and in response to low participation of Indigenous Australians in higher education.

As of March 2021, the basic under-22 allowance for ABSTUDY allowance is A$445.80 per fortnight, and over-22 is A$545.80 per fortnight.

== See also ==
- Austudy Payment, Australian Government social security payment for students, paid under the Social Security Act 1991
