= Work for the Dole =

Australian government welfare program requiring work to receive benefits

Work for the Dole is an Australian Government program that is a form of workfare, or work-based welfare. It was first permanently enacted in 1998, having been trialled in 1997. It is one means by which job seekers can satisfy the "mutual obligation requirements" to receive the Newstart Allowance, now replaced by the JobSeeker Payment. Other "mutual obligation" measures can include: accredited study, part-time work, Australian Army Reserves, and volunteer work.

Under the Howard government, the scheme was compulsory and targeted the long-term unemployed. Shortly after the Rudd government was formed it became voluntary. From 1 July 2015, Work for the Dole became effectively compulsory for the majority of Newstart Allowance recipients. On 20 March 2020, during the COVID-19 pandemic, Work for the Dole was suspended, alongside all other mutual obligation requirements. Mutual obligations returned to all states and territories in September 2020, excluding the State of Victoria which saw its reintroduction in November 2020. Work for the Dole's suspension was lifted 'where it [was] safe to do so' with the reintroduction of mutual obligations, and eventually being reviewed and modified with new requirements in October 2021.

== Basic Work for the Dole ==
Placements are available in a wide range of areas including heritage, the environment, arts, community care, tourism, sport and making and maintaining community services and facilities. Most projects benefit the general community through services and adding value to civic assets; however, some projects in drought-affected areas are designed to benefit private enterprise (through the Drought Force scheme).

External videos
- Parliament Question Time, 30 May 2014 Luke Hartsuyker, Assistant Minister for Employment, responding to a question.

Upon successful completion of a Work for the Dole placement, participants are usually eligible for a Training Credit to assist with accredited training ($800 for six months, less for less time), a Passport to Employment package of job application training, and a fortnightly transport supplement.

Work for the Dole services are delivered through community or local government bodies. Job seekers may be required by the government to take part in Work for the Dole if they are aged 18 or 19 years, recently completed Year 12, getting the full rate of Youth Allowance, and have been getting payments for three months or more, or aged 18 to 59 years, getting the full rate of Youth Allowance or JobSeeker Payment, and have been getting payments for twelve months or more.

In addition, job seekers aged 18 and over who get either allowance can volunteer to participate in an activity at any time. Those participating in the program usually do so for 50 hours per fortnight. Each placement lasts for six months, and is followed by six months without obligation to participate.

Work for the Dole participants may receive an extra $20.80 per fortnight, on top of their Allowance payments. Protective clothing is provided by the project sponsor if it is needed. Essential training, such as occupational health and safety training, is also provided. Transport costs are not separately covered however, and can easily absorb the additional payment – especially for those undertaking the "full time" version.

Other mutual obligation options that have been on offer include approved training, volunteering, Drought Force; for 17–24 year olds the Green Army Program and PaTH Internships; and in remote areas the Community Development Program and Community Development Employment Projects.

== History ==
Work for the Dole was first proposed by the Liberal Party in 1987 and was enacted on a trial basis a year after it gained public support at the 1996 federal election in a Liberal/National coalition. Despite mixed feelings among younger people, at whom the program was aimed, there was little mainstream opposition when launched.

On 1 July 1998, all job seekers aged 18–24 that had been claiming benefits for six months or more were required to join the scheme. From 19 April 1999, job seekers aged 17 or 18 and who had left Year 12 had to join the scheme after three months of job seeking. During the 2000 Summer Olympic Games, all those of an eligible age who had been unemployed for three months or more and lived in Sydney were required to participate. This temporary change was made to encourage people to take up casual work during the Games. In December 2000, Work for the Dole was expanded to include those aged 35–39. Additionally, those aged 40–49 could volunteer themselves for the scheme for the first time. On 1 July 2002, Training Credits were paid to those completing the scheme for the first time. The initial amount was $800 for six months work.

In December 2002, the Drought Force initiative was enacted. Previously, all Work for the Dole projects directly benefited the public, community organisations or civic assets. However, this scheme expanded the scope to include work for privately owned agricultural properties in areas deemed to be experiencing exceptional circumstances (generally drought). On 1 July 2006, "Full Time Work for the Dole" was enacted for those seeking work for 12 months or more. They were directed towards a scheme identical to the standard form, except that the fortnightly hours of participation was increased to 50.

Despite speculation otherwise, the Rudd government maintained Work for the Dole. During the Gillard government participation rates dropped significantly.

In July 2015 Work for the Dole was scaled up, with wider age groups as part of the government's welfare policy under former Australian Prime Minister Tony Abbott. The programme is administered by a network of private companies. Participants are required to perform a number of hours of community work to continue to receive Newstart Allowance.

In April 2016, 18 year old Josh Park-Fing died while on a Work for the Dole placement.

In the 2016 Australian federal budget, an alternative to the Work for the Dole program was introduced, targeted at unemployed youth under 25: the Youth Jobs PaTH, an internship programme.

In September 2020 (November for Victoria), the Australian Government announced Work for the Dole's recommencement 'where it is safe to do so'. New obligations for job seekers aged 18 years and over were introduced in October 2021.

== Reviews ==
A number of reviews of Work for the Dole have been undertaken; these include:

- 2007 Australian National Audit Office
- 2016 Australian National University's (ANU) Social Research Centre

== Academic and media commentary ==
Judith Bessant, in "Civil Conscription or Reciprocal Obligation: The Ethics of 'Work for the Dole'", questioned the Government's justifications for the scheme, which centred on providing a means for young people to get back into the workforce by improving their work ethic. Bessant argues that there is no evidence that poor attitudes towards work, disorganisation, or other personal failings are the primary source of youth unemployment, which she instead attributes to globalisation, the offshoring of unskilled labour, and increased application of labour-saving technologies in industry.

From an economic perspective, Anne Hawke in "'Work for the Dole' - A Cheap Labour Market Program? An Economist's Perspective", praised the scheme for its potential, but noted that it was not fully voluntary; this would make it difficult for employers to establish whether a person had the positive workplace characteristics associated with voluntary participation, or the less desirable characteristics associated with compulsory participation.

Several academics have pointed out that Work for the Dole is the embodiment of a paradigm shift in which welfare support is no longer being considered a "right", but rather "conditional support" in which unemployed people are expected to undertake their "mutual obligation". Shaver suggests this violates the assumption that all citizens are equal in the status, dignity and worth that are necessary for full participation in democratic society. Little research or debate has centred on the economic imperative of forced labor at approximately half the rate of the minimum wage.

Subsequent studies have investigated the impact of Work for the Dole in Australian society and found that because it compels or contracts individuals to contribute, it "may actually weaken their long-term commitment to society", while another has suggested it may be discriminatory because it was found to benefit men but not women. A 2013 examination of Department of Employment data revealed the program is one of the least effective ways to help people find jobs. Work for the Dole has also been criticised by the Australian Council for Social Services. The Australian Greens do not support the program, describing it as cruel and punitive.

In 2015, ahead of reforms to the scheme which were implemented in July, Prime Minister Tony Abbott was criticised by sections of the media and other politicians for characterising the Work for the Dole scheme as an opportunity for employers to "try before they buy".

The 2016 ANU's Social Research Centre review found that the scheme improved the probability of an unemployed person finding work by 2%. The Welfare Rights Centre and the Australian Council of Social Service both responded that the scheme was expensive and failed to deliver value for money.

== See also ==
- New Deal (UK)
- Jobseeker's Allowance (UK)
- Workfare (UK)
