= Social Security Act 1991 =

Australian law

The Social Security Act 1991 (SSA) is an act passed by the Parliament of Australia in 1991 to provide for the payment, to eligible people in Australia, of certain pensions, benefits and allowances, and for other related purposes.

The SSA was enacted to replace the Social Security Act 1947. In 1999, the Social Security (Administration) Act 1999 was enacted, in which the provisions in the SSA concerning the administration of social security payments were split into a separate Act.

The SSA has been criticised by judges for its length and complexity. In Secretary, Department of Family and Community Services v Geeves, Weinberg J, sitting on the Full Court of the Federal Court of Australia noted:

I should add the following comments. It is almost farcical that it should take eminent senior counsel the best part of a morning simply to take the Court through the various provisions of the Social Security Act that are relevant in order to determine whether a particular individual is entitled to a benefit under that Act. The question whether Ms Geeves should receive a carer’s benefit for looking after Mr Escott ought to be able to be answered relatively easily. There is nothing extraordinary about his situation, and it can hardly be said that the legislature did not anticipate cases such as his.

Regrettably, as each year goes by, the Social Security Act becomes still more complex, and less accessible to those who most need to understand it. This point has been made on earlier occasions. In Anstis v Secretary, Department of Social Security (1999) 94 FCR 421, I described the Act as having been drafted in a manner "both prolix and obscure". I also referred to the observations of the Full Court in Blunn v Cleaver (1993) 47 FCR 111 in which it was noted that the object of the Bill that became the Act was said by the Minister, in his Second Reading Speech, to be "to overcome the problem of readability by using a ‘clear English’ drafting style and format". The Minister went on to say that this should make the Act "a more accessible piece of legislation that ordinary Australians can reasonably be expected to understand".

As at January 2014, the SSA is administered by the Department of Social Services and the Attorney-General's Department.

== External sources ==
- Social Security Act 1991 in the Federal Register of Legislation
- Social Security Act 1991 on Austlii
