= Affordable housing in Canada =

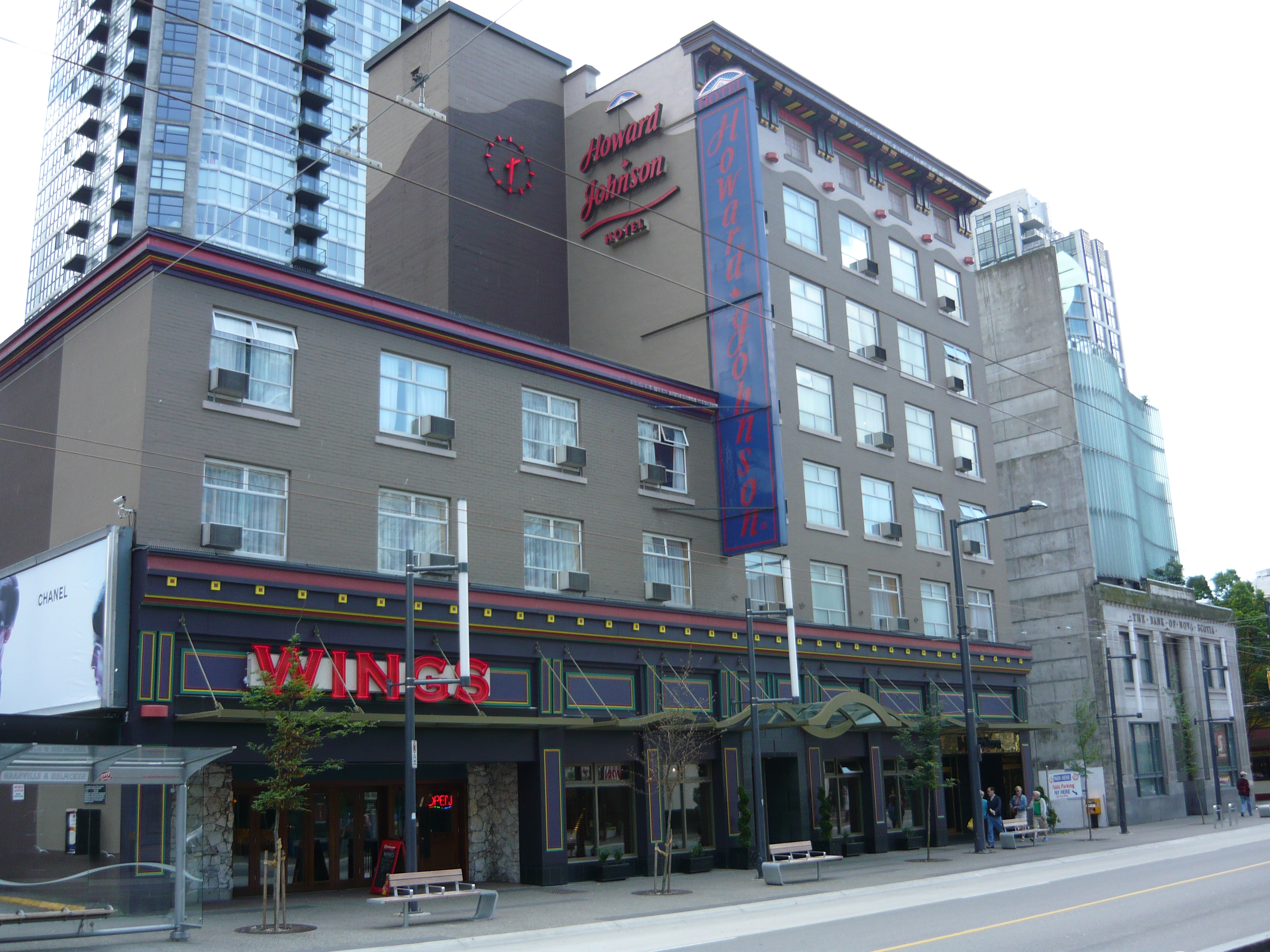
Hotel Martinique provides social housing in Vancouver. Social housing is one subtype of affordable housing.

In Canada, affordable housing refers to living spaces that are financially accessible to people with a median household income. Canada ranks among the lowest of the most developed countries for housing affordability. Housing affordability is generally measured based on a shelter-cost-to-income ratio (STIR) of 30% by the Canada Mortgage and Housing Corporation (CMHC), the national housing agency of Canada. It encompasses a continuum ranging from market-based options like affordable rental housing and affordable home ownership, to non-market alternatives such as government-subsidized housing (emergency shelters, transitional housing, and public housing).

== Definition ==
Definitions of "affordable housing" in Canada vary among governments and organizations, typically referring to housing that costs less than 30% of gross household income or is targeted towards those with greater need, such as households earning below thresholds like $60,000 in certain cities. The Canadian housing continuum ranges from non-market options (including shelters and social housing) to market housing such as private rentals and ownership.

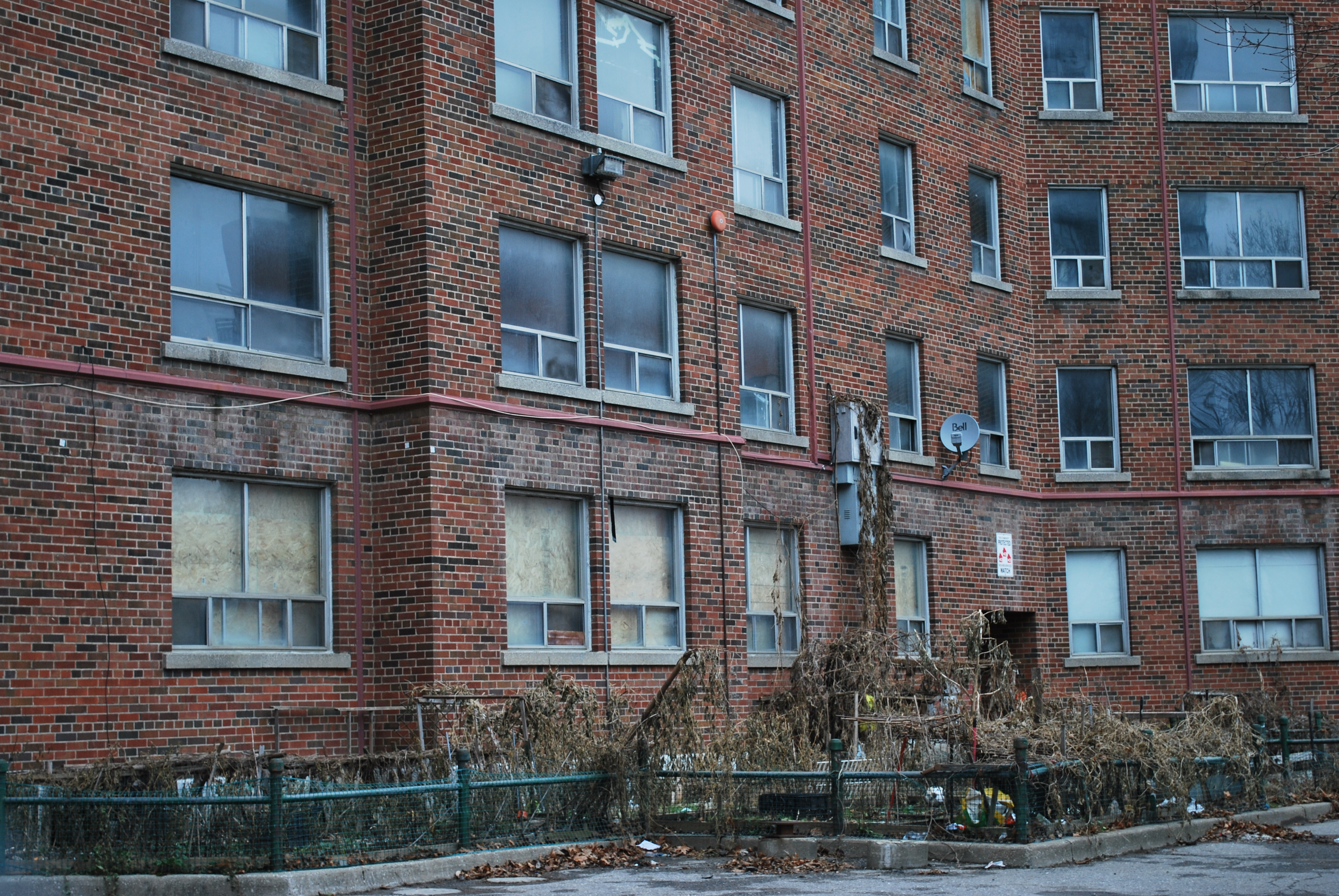
The Regent Park apartments in Toronto's Cabbagetown neighborhood were intended to be community housing, but they have become dilapidated.

Social housing in Canada is generally defined as housing that is targeted to low-income households and offered at below-market rents, typically provided by governments or non-profits, and sometimes via rent supplements in private rentals; this aligns with the OECD definition and includes terms like rent-geared-to-income or rent-assisted units. According to a 2025 analysis by the Parliamentary Budget Officer, Canada lacks reliable data on its social housing stock, but the best estimates indicate there are about 600,000 to 700,000 units—a figure that has changed little in the past 30 years. Most of this housing was built before 1994, with ongoing federal support provided through long-term operating agreements. As of 2024, social and community housing accounted for approximately 3–4% of Canada's housing stock, while most households either own their home or rent at market rates.

As of 2018, the market-based housing system accounted for approximately 80% of Canadian households' housing acquisitions. About two thirds of Canadian households are home owners, and one third are renters who rent market-rate and non-market units.

To restore affordability, Canada needs to double housing starts from about 250,000 to 430,000–480,000 units per year through 2035.

== Measuring housing affordability ==
Measuring affordability of housing is complicated by Canada's vast physical and human geography which includes both remote northern communities and affluent urban regions. A common rule of thumb is to calculate how much of a household's income is spent on housing expenses each month. For example, if a household spends more on average on housing expenses than each month, then their housing situation may be considered unaffordable. In a 1994 background paper commissioned by the Ontario Human Rights Commission, J. David Hulchanski, the North American editor of the international journal Housing Studies, described how the ratio of housing cost as a percentage of income was 12% from 1900 until the early 1920s, when it was increased to 20%. This increased again to 25% in the 1960s, and by the mid-1980s it reached 30%. In Canada, the commonly used 20% rule of thumb was adjusted to 25% in the 1950s. In the 1980s, this was replaced by a 30% rule. When the monthly carrying costs of a home exceed 30–35% of household income, then housing expenses are considered unaffordable. While the 30% rule continues to be used by the CMHC, banks, and mortgage providers, it has been challenged by Hulchanski and others.

A 2011 article recommended tracking indicators like the share of affordable rental units for median earners, wage requirements to rent, demand for assistance, core housing need, shelter use, eviction filings, arrears or foreclosures, and vacancy rates, to better measure Canadian housing insecurity and policy outcomes.

A 2012 Macdonald-Laurier Institute report argued for 40-year amortization options for young buyers in expensive markets and criticized CMHC's mortgage insurance for generating substantial federal revenues from first-time and lower-income buyers, while also noting that current affordability metrics are too lenient and should consider net, not gross, income and actual household expenses.

The City of Calgary describes affordable housing in terms of need. A household is in need of affordable housing when it earns less than $60,000/year and spends over 30% of gross income on the cost of housing. Alternatively, mortgage lending institutions define affordability in terms of potential home buyers considering the relative cost of debt based on interest rates and average household incomes. This measure of affordability is not oriented towards renters.

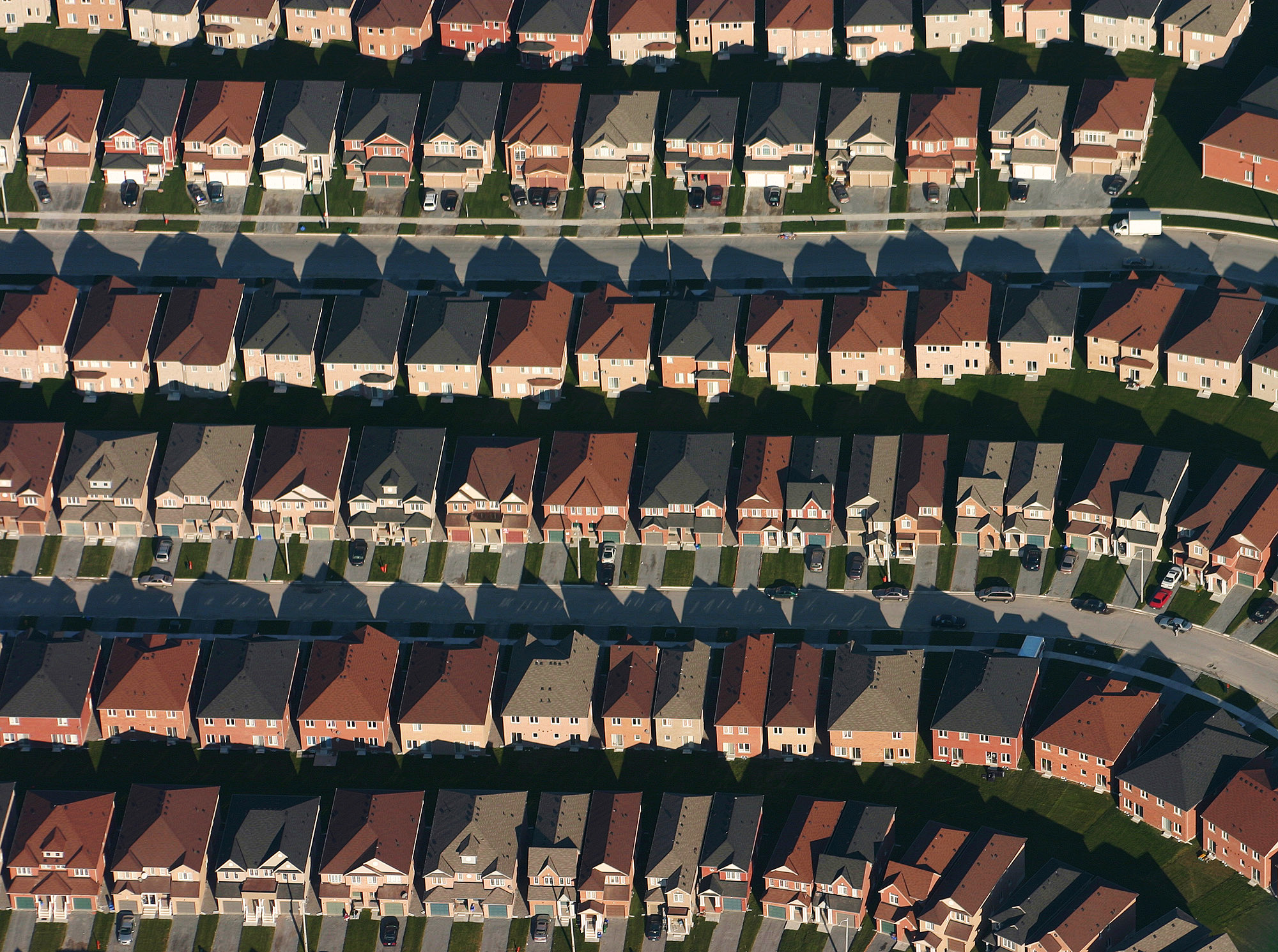
A large proportion of Canadians are housed in market-based suburban developments such as Markham, Ontario

Accurate measurement of housing affordability is needed to decide if a family qualifies for assistance in housing or for a mortgage to purchase privately. While the 30% rule may be used for the latter, banks and lending agencies might require a much higher Qualifying Income before approving a mortgage.

=== Shelter-cost-to-income ratio ===
The shelter-cost-to-income ratio (STIR), commonly set at no more than 30% of gross household income, is the most frequent benchmark for housing affordability, but definitions and included costs vary and have notable limitations. STIR often fails to capture the true financial burden on lower-income or diverse households, prompting recognition of its shortcomings by organizations like CMHC.

=== Housing affordability indexes in market-based housing ===
The Bank of Canada's Housing Affordability Index (HAI), the Royal Bank of Canada Housing Affordability Measure, and the National Bank of Canada's Housing Affordability Monitor are examples of indexes used by financial institutions involved in the real estate market. The HAI is based on housing costs, which includes mortgage payments and utilities, in relation to disposable income of a representative household. The HAI represents the percentage of disposable income the average Canadian household would need to cover the mortgage and utilities of their home. By December 2023, with increases in mortgage rates and the price of houses, the Bank of Canada reported that affordability was the worst since 1982. Since the beginning of the COVID-19 pandemic in 2020, house prices saw a significant increase of over 34%. By 2023, the low supply of housing including rental units, across Canada also caused rents to soar. By 2022, with an unexpected demand coupled with a diminishing supply of residential real estate along with historically low interest rates—set during the pandemic to stabilize the economy—the price of housing rose sky high in Canada. The BBC said that Canada faced some "of the worst housing affordability issues in the world." Based on OECD data, the "disconnect" between the average home price—$817,000—and household incomes is "one of the most dramatic". The price represents over "nine times household income."

== Current situation ==
=== Financialization of housing ===
According to research by housing expert Steve Pomeroy, Canada experienced a significant decline in private rental housing between 2011 and 2016 due chiefly to the financialization of housing, with over 300,000 units disappearing from the market and fewer than 20,000 new subsidized units added. The financialization of housing refers to the use of housing by Real Estate Investment Trusts (REIT) and private equity as a profit-making financial instrument. Financialized landlords include large corporations such as Avenue Living and MainStreet that engage in en masse purchasing of undervalued rental apartments. These units that were previously affordable for lower income households, are upgraded as higher-end rental units.

In May and June 2024, during a series of House of Commons hearings on the financialization of housing, Federal Housing Advocate, Marie-Josée Houle, said that it is widespread and increasing, has "very little oversight", and a "negative impact on housing in Canada". According to Houle, who reports to the Canadian Human Rights Commission, it contributes to deteriorating housing conditions and affordability of housing, displacements, and evictions.

In a CBC Fifth Estate episode and accompanying CBC News article investigating how Canada had fallen into a "rental crisis", which could affect a third of the Canadian population, they found that one of the major factors considered was the financialization of the rental housing sector. The investigation found that municipality and city systems view these practices as an advantageous revenue stream, facilitating these systemic opportunities driven by individual gain, capitalizing on the absence of regulations and market conditions. CBC while examined the issue from the point of view of renters—single parents, large families, pensioners and others on fixed or low incomes, young people starting their careers—who felt that their voices were not being heard.

In a Fifth Estate interview, Calgary-based Michael Brooks—CEO of Real Property Association of Canada (REALPAC), which lobbies the federal government on behalf of Canada's largest commercial real estate companies—said that the private sector was not "primarily in the business of providing a public good," such as affordable housing. The private sector is "self-interested in maintaining and growing their income." They "want to be seen as contributing to the solution and not being part of the problem." Their obligations are to their investors, which includes managing costs. REALPAC members, an association that was established in 1970, comprised $1 trillion in assets under management across Canada by 2022.

The Brookings Institution lists real estate investment trusts (REITS), along with large Canadian banks, and multinational corporations as the "most reliable dividend payers" and recommends that pensioners invest in these financial instruments. During the pandemic, REITs and other financial landlords "thrived" with individual REITs posting 100s of millions in profits in the first three months alone. They benefited from the historically low interest rates backed by the CMHC to buy and sell multi-family residential buildings, refinance debt, do renovations that allowed them to raise rents.

=== Residential land use by-laws ===
The role of municipalities in housing policy is significant, particularly in setting policies related to zoning, land-use, and in the prevention of homelessness. At times, financial constraints come into play as well, since their primary funding source for housing strategies is often property taxes.

In response to the federal government's 2023 $4-billion Housing Accelerator Fund, municipalities have been amending land use by-laws to allow for more flexibility in zoning in order to claim federal funding tied to zoning changes.

The provincial and territorial governments provide the most funding for housing and they determine limits on municipal governments. Provinces and territories establish their own regulatory framework for housing and set their own laws which can restrict what municipalities can do. However, the federal government provides funding to provinces, territories, and occasionally directly to municipalities through bilateral agreements. A 2022 report by the University of Toronto's Institute on Municipal Finance and Governance calls for more co-operation between levels of government to respond to the affordability crisis in housing.

In a 2018 Journal of the American Planning Association article, four researchers described how the changing role of government in Canada since the 1970s affected affordable housing for those with lower incomes. Public policies since the 1970s favoured more market-based solutions, and as a result the government's role in providing social services was reduced, including in the provision of affordable housing for those with lower incomes. Public policies—such as "inclusionary zoning, density bonuses, and housing trusts" introduced at that time in some municipalities in the United States to reduce housing affordability pressures for lower income earners—were not adopted in Canada at the same rate. The authors said that in the absence of any adequate policies to balance housing needs of those whose ability to pay is constrained with the market's natural tendency to provide housing to those who can afford to pay, led the growth of developments in central locations where amenities are rich for homebuyers whose incomes were increasingly higher than lower income earners.

Research from the 2018 study showed that there is a "disconnect between evidence and public policy" in terms of urban planning based on promoting increased density and mixed-use zoning in cities like Toronto. An unintended negative consequence of these "quintessential tenets of good urban design, has been a decrease in affordable housing. The article showed that in mixed-use zones, high-income earners in sectors such as "management, business, technology, and health" experienced greater housing affordability—they spent a smaller percentage of their income on housing even with higher priced housing because their incomes had increased. Housing affordability worsened for those with occupations in manufacturing, trades and cultural and social services. Their incomes had either remained stagnant or decreased over time and/or housing costs had increased. While this study focused on Toronto, the findings would be similar in other major census metropolitan areas (CMAs) like Vancouver.

Housing economists have cautioned against attributing housing unaffordability primarily to immigration levels. Following renewed political attention to record immigration rates amid the housing crisis, a January 2024 CBC News analysis found that economists and housing experts identified high interest rates, increasing construction costs, and municipal red tape slowing housing approvals as concurrent pressures on the housing market. David Hulchanski, a professor of housing and community development at the University of Toronto, questioned whether policy should require newcomers to settle only where housing supply exists, since immigrants are free to choose where they live.

A February 2026 CMHC study, drawing on data from more than 400 municipalities, found that municipal land-use regulation was independently associated with higher home prices: a 10% increase in a city's regulatory restrictiveness was associated with an approximately 14% increase in house prices, after accounting for population, density, and growth.

== History ==
=== Early 20th century ===
Following the Great Depression and World War II many Canadians lived in inadequate housing as fewer new homes were built, older homes needed repairs, and families lived in over-crowded dwellings. The 1935 Dominion Housing Act (DHA) established the focus of federal policies on housing programs as market-oriented (as opposed to social welfare-oriented) for decades to come. For example, the DHA included no subsidized low rental housing; instead it introduced a joint government private lender mortgage loans for the 20% of Canadians who could afford to purchase real estate in the marketplace. During the post-WWII period federal housing policy included using taxation to revitalize the housing market, while also building social housing and subsidizing rental housing in the private sector.

In 1946, the federal Wartime Housing Corporation was replaced with Central Mortgage and Housing Corporation—now known as Canada Mortgage and Housing Corporation (CMHC)—a federal Crown corporation. The CMHC administered the National Housing Act providing Canadians with grants, loans to purchase homes in the market system, and with mortgage insurance on credit financing through private lenders. In the late 1940s the federal government provided 75% of funding and subsidies, with the provinces adding 25%, towards public social and rental housing for low-income families.

In the 1950s, municipalities received federal grants towards urban renewal projects which included low-rent housing developments, some of which included rent-geared-to-income (RGI) subsidies. With the introduction of the CMHC's Mortgage Loan Insurance, home ownership became more accessible. The federally backed insurance allowed homebuyers and private mortgage providers to take a greater risk on mortgages that had a 25% down payment.

From the 1950s to the 1970s, the government built "dedicated affordable rental stock and public housing".

During the 1960s, Canada's economy grew at a sustained pace. In the mid-1960s, Prime Minister Lester Pearson said that in a democratic society the goal must be for everyone to have "decent housing." In the 1970s, public housing policy obligation was based on ensuring all Canadians were adequately housed. Through amendments to the National Housing Act in 1973, 20,000 social housing units were built every year.

During the Premiership of Pierre Elliot Trudeau, then-Minister of Urban Affairs Ron Basford introduced the amended National Housing Act by saying, "When we talk about people's basic needs—the requirements for survival—society and the government obviously have an obligation to assure that these basic needs of shelter are met." Housing strategies focused on "rehousing people into better housing and neighbourhoods."

Before 1970, almost all housing policy was federal and only 5% of government programs were dedicated to low-income housing. Starting in the early 1970s, for almost two decades there were approximately 16,000 non-profit or co-op homes built or acquired every year. In the next ten years, the number of residential co-operatives dropped to about 1,500 homes a year. This began to change in the 1970s, as government role was reduced.

=== 1980s ===
Under the Canadian Constitution, housing policy and programs are the responsibility of the provinces. In practice the federal government, along with the provinces and municipalities, share the responsibility.

Starting in the 1980s, federal housing policies changed and more households across Canada began to experience housing affordability pressures, including those who own the residences in which they live and those who rent. Under the premiership of Brian Mulroney significant cuts to federal housing programs were initiated, effectively ending many national initiatives for affordable housing. In 1984, the federal government began cutting back on social housing. (Note: In the late 1980s, housing policy debates in the United Kingdom shifted away from discussion of housing need to more market-oriented analyses of affordability (Whitehead 1991:12).)

Around that time, the concept of "core housing need" was developed by the Canada Mortgage and Housing Corporation as a basis for evaluating those eligible for federal funding under the 1986 Global Agreements on Social Housing, an agreement between the federal and provincial/territorial governments regarding administration and cost sharing of social housing programs under the National Housing Act and the CMHC Act. A household is considered to be in core housing need if it meets certain criteria—if it falls below acceptable standards of affordability, adequacy, or suitability and if the cost of housing exceeds 30% or more of its before-tax household income.

There was a consistent increase in housing affordability problems starting in the early 1980s in "all regions and major cities" and for almost all social classes of Canadian households, according to a 2004 article in the Housing Studies journal. Affordability problems were "highly concentrated" in low-income households, particularly in households led by women.

In the late 1980s, there was a major shift in housing policies, which included amendments to taxation that benefitted those who could afford homeownership. At the same time, the federal government withdrew from funding projects for social and affordable housing resulting in a dramatic decline in affordable housing stock. There was a "massive investment" in building houses and condominiums and a dramatic decline in purpose-built rental apartment units. Investors purchased some condos for rental units but rents were priced at the "higher end of market" and were affordable only for households with higher incomes.

=== 1990s ===
During the 1990s, there was a devolution of new responsibilities, including affordable housing, from provincial governments to municipal governments without adequate revenue tools. Since the early 1990s, the responsibility of providing support for affordable housing, and a number of other social issues related to the environment, Indigenous Peoples (First Nations, Inuit, and Métis), public health and security, had been down-loaded with no increase in sources of funding.

In the 1990s, although the price of houses remained "remarkably stable," income inequality increased and housing affordability problems became more prevalent and more severe. Throughout the decade, the federal government was focused on cutting the federal deficit, and began to transfer responsibility to supply social housing for those in need—including low-income housing—to the provinces and territories. The provinces and territories transferred some of these responsibilities to municipalities without providing corresponding financial resources.

By 1991, Canadian public policy on the affordability of housing was more aligned with the concept of need than in the United Kingdom in the 1980s, for example, where the concept of affordability was more market-oriented. (Note: In the United Kingdom for example since the late 1980s, housing policy debates shifted away from discussion of housing need to more market-oriented analyses of affordability (Whitehead 1991-12).)

By 1996, the federal government revoked the Canada Assistance Plan of 1966, which made it mandatory that people whose income was inadequate to meet basic needs (including the working poor) have access to an established appeals procedures in the provinces and territories regarding social assistance. In the same year, the federal government transferred responsibility for most existing federal housing program to the provinces.

Between 1993 and 2003, while federal government revenues increased 12% and the provinces and territories increased 13%, municipalities' revenues only increased by 8%. From 1993 to 2004, federal and provincial fiscal transfers to municipalities decreased from 25 cents per dollar of municipal revenue to 16 cents, representing a decrease of 37% while their responsibilities had increased resulting in a fiscal imbalance.

Also in the 1990s, real estate investment trusts (REITs), hedge funds, private equity firms, and publicly listed real estate firms entered the urban rental market in large North American cities, and later on nationally and in other anglophone countries like the United Kingdom, Australia, and Ireland; for the next 15 years they expanded exponentially. REITs emerged in Canada when the Canadian Income Tax Act in 1995 allowed REITs to qualify as closed-end trusts, with the first REIT established in Canada being in 1997 in Toronto. In the 15 years between 2000 and 2015, the ownership of Toronto apartments was increasingly concentrated among REITs, institutional investors, private equity funds and some large family-owned firms.

=== 2000s ===
Since 2000 the cost of renting increased by more than 20%.

To support affordable housing in 2001, the Canada Mortgage and Housing Corporation introduced Canada Mortgage Bonds, with a focus on low-cost interest rates and mortgages.

The Affordable Housing Initiative (AHI), operating from 2001 to 2011, was an intergovernmental multilateral housing initiative on affordable housing in Canada. The federal government, working through the CMHC, provided funding for the supply of new affordable rental housing under the Affordable Housing Program with CA$1 billion from 2001 to 2008 (to be matched by provinces and territories). (Note: The federal government promised to invest an additional CAD$1.9 billion from 2008 to 2013 for housing and homelessness programs for low-income Canadians.) The federal government placed the AHI within the Affordable Housing Framework 2011–2014 to improve "access to affordable, sound, suitable and sustainable housing." The Framework acknowledged that a wide range of solutions was required to respond to the diversity of affordable housing program needs and priorities specific to each jurisdiction. Under the Framework, it was reiterated that the responsibility for the design and delivery of affordable housing programs lay with the provinces and territories. The provinces and territories would be given flexibility in how to invest federal funds that were to be matched by provinces and territories, if the overall intended outcome was reached. The goal was "to reduce the number of Canadians in housing need by improving access to affordable housing that is sound, suitable and sustainable" Examples of initiatives that could be undertaken under the Framework included "new construction, renovation, homeownership assistance, rent supplements, shelter allowances, and accommodations for victims of family violence."

A 2003 TD Economic report recommended that government initiatives should focus on raising market incomes at the lower end, as the number of low-income households was too high. The report raised concerns about low-income households that were subject to provincial and federal claw backs and tax backs, for example, on back to work and the federal-provincial National Child Benefit (NCB). The report said that decreasing the number of low income household would be more effective than the inefficient, expensive, publicly funded expenditure-based or tax-based incentives to increase the number of affordable rental units.

The TD report concluded that municipalities need a more sustainable funding arrangement, and provinces need to play a more active role in affordable housing, becoming leaders within the Affordable Housing Framework agreement.

By 2004, 1.7 million Canadians experienced housing affordability issues.

As of 2006, the CMHC directed those needing subsidized housing for low-income households to the municipal government. In 2011 the Canadian Federation of Municipalities called for better coordination between the three levels of government as the expanded responsibilities were either "unfunded or underfunded."

The number of rental units declined starting in 2005.

The 2006 Canadian federal budget "provided $300 million for affordable housing in the territories."

By 2007, affordability of housing was a problem for low and middle income Canadians. Canadians in the lowest quintile who were in renters households were 18 times more likely than the average household to experience affordability problems.

With historically low interest rates, and readily available debt and mortgage financing in 2007, Canada's housing market was in a period of strong growth. Affordable housing was a relative measure. At the same time private affordable rental stock across Canada was low. In many cities the vacancy rate for affordable rental units was less than 1%.

According to reports in 2006 and 2010, rising income inequality has been cited as a contributing factor.

From 2009 through 2014, the federal government budgeted $388 million a year for the housing sector.

The 2009 Canadian federal budget allocated funds for the period covering 2009–2011: renovation and energy retrofits to social housing ($1 billion); to build housing for low-income seniors ($400 million); to build social housing for persons with disabilities ($75 million); to support social housing in the North ($200 million); low-cost loans to municipalities to improve housing-related infrastructure ($2 billion) as part of Canada's Economic Action Plan.

=== 2010s ===
As of 2010, housing prices and construction costs rose dramatically in Canada as they did elsewhere in the world.

There was a modest improvement in housing affordability across Canada in the third quarter of 2011 after two consecutive quarters of deterioration. Part of this was due to decreased costs in home ownership resulting from lower mortgage rates.

By 2012, the rising inequality gap had presented a significant challenge for Canadian households who were "priced out" of rental and ownership housing markets. By that year, there was a slight deterioration in housing affordability, according to the Royal Bank of Canada (RBC). (Note: RBC measures erosion, deterioration and/or improvements in affordability of housing in terms of levels of ease or difficulty for Canadians to carry the costs of home ownership comparing price, mortgage rate, utilities and taxes and income while also considering fundamentals such as supply-and-demand and market slowdown. Vigorous housing demand raises prices if supply has not kept pace. RBC also examines soft factors such as weather; mild weather, for example, motivates consumer demand for housing (RBC 2012-08).)

Many parts of the country that year also reported that key workers—teachers, nurses, police officers, construction workers and others—who earned reasonably good income from their professions, were finding it increasingly difficult to afford the high cost of housing." According to a 2012 report by the Federation of Canadian Municipalities, one third of Canadians were renters. The construction and rehabilitation of affordable rental units did not kept pace with the number of affordable rental units lost to demolition, urban intensification projects and the more profitable conversion to condominiums. Fewer than 10% of new housing starts by 2012 were rental units. The FCA found that the shortage of available rental housing is worsening at the same time that more Canadians are being priced out of home ownership.

In 2012, while Canada had a strong real estate market many Canadian households faced housing insecurity.

At the 2018 National Housing Conference hosted by the CMHC, concerns were raised about a stark increase in the financialization of the housing sector that had extended into the private rental market. Canadian Federation of Apartment Associations disagreed with the premise, and described conference featured speakers as "progressives." Issues included the rise of "amateur landlords," condominiums, Airbnb, short-term rentals, increased rents, and problems with evictions. Multiple-residential buildings are being purchased as housing assets to generate wealth at a time when rental units are in short supply.

The 2022 federal budget, released on April 7, called for a review of tax treatment for large corporate trusts that use residential real estate as financial investment instruments. This review would examine the impact of housing as an asset class on Canadian homebuyers and renters. The budget also included $1.5 billion for housing cooperatives as part of the solution to the affordable housing crisis. From the early 1990s to 2020, 25 of the biggest financial landlords—including REITs—consolidated about 330,000 rental suites representing 20% of Canada's "private, purpose-built stock of rental apartments." As of 2021, REITs and other financial landlords benefit from preferential tax treatment, which Martine August described as state subsidies. August has called on the CMHC to stop providing financial landlords with "preferential mortgage lending rates", which are effectively subsidies to firms that are not providing public good. She also calls on the federal government to disallow financial landlords form accessing National Housing Strategy loans and grants since these firms "eliminate affordable housing as a business strategy."

=== 2020s ===
The 2020 report on the 2018 Survey revealed that 1,644,900 Canadian households or 11.6% were in core housing need, compared to 12.7% reported in the 2016 Canadian census. In 2016, the Canadian regions with the most households experiencing core housing need included Nunavut at 36.5%, Northwest Territories at 15.5%, Ontario at 15.3%, and Yukon at 15.2%. The 2016 Census also showed that the highest rates of core housing need in metropolitan areas were Toronto at 19.1% and Vancouver at 17.6%.

By May 2021, the price of housing increased with a "rapid acceleration," the supply of housing and mortgage rates were at historic lows and the demand increased, with economists at the Royal Bank of Canada and the Canadian Imperial Bank of Commerce raising concerns that speculators were entering the market, pricing young and lower income families out of affordable housing. With 424 housing units per 1,000 people, Canada ranks lowest of the G7 nations (Note: Canada, France, Germany, Italy, Japan, the UK and the United States are members of the G7, an organisation of the seven largest economies, that play a dominant role in the international financial system and trade.) in "average housing supply per capita" compared to France, which has 540 units per 1,000—the largest housing supply per capita. Within Canada, the available housing supply inventory is the lowest on record. It reflects a chronic insufficiency of home supply. From 2016 to 2021, the population of Canada increased to about 37 million with the arrival of 1.8 million new residents who often prefer to live in the "downtowns and distant suburbs of large cities."

The COVID-19 pandemic exacerbated housing pressures including the unpredicted preference for housing type and geographic location. During the pandemic, in February 2022, it was reported that the Canadian housing market was experiencing an unexpected boom with record-breaking high prices, combined with historically low interest rates and a decreasing supply of real estate. In both 2020 and 2021 real estate sales records were broken. By the end of 2021, the MLS Home Price Index was a record 25.3% higher than 2020. During the pandemic, inter-provincial migration was also strong and continued into 2022, which also contributed to high prices.

In the 2022 federal budget, "A Plan to Grow Our Economy and Make Life More Affordable", released on April 7, the federal government responded to concerns about the role of the speculative market in sky-high real estate prices. A two-year ban on "foreign buyers" was introduced. However, the ban was restricted to purchases without plans to develop housing in 2023 federal budget, on the grounds of stimulating housing construction.

== Research and observations ==
Eighty per cent of Canadians are served by market-based housing, which includes individual home ownership and private rental housing. In the market-based housing system, individuals finance their own housing, independent of government assistance.

A 2019 Royal Bank of Canada RBC Economics report on home affordability said that, in 9 of the 14 market areas they track, a majority of Canadian families are able to purchase an average home. The most affordable markets are Saint John, St. John's, Regina, Quebec City and Halifax, while the least affordable markets are Vancouver, Toronto, and Victoria.

Statistics Canada reported that, while Canada's "real gross domestic product (GDP) per capita increased by roughly 50% between 1980 and 2005," and the workforce increased educational attainment and work experience during this same period and median earnings among the top 20% of full-time full-year employees grew by 17.9%, among those in the bottom one-fifth of the distribution median earnings decreased by 13.3%." Full-time full-year median earnings of Canadians edged only slightly higher from $41,348 in 1980 to $41,401 in 2005.

Ryerson City Building Institute's research and policy manager Graham Haines in Toronto said in 2017 that Canadian policymakers had focused almost exclusively on promoting home ownership since the late 1990s creating a pattern of building housing units, like condos, for investors rather than the end users—the renters. By "letting the market do what the market wants," Canada neglected the needs of its population, Haines wrote. This resulted in a decades-long decline in the supply of purpose-built rental apartments as developers preferred to build condominiums especially with favourable tax policies and incentives in place. Haines said that as millennials reach an age where they are ready to become homebuyers they may well be competing for the same condominiums as seniors who want to downsize. Haines called for public policy changes that favour the construction of appropriate rental units that are affordable for those who will be using them, recognizing that rent will be a significant part of the real estate sector in Canada.

In a 2020 Housing Studies article, Megan Nethercote, a Vice Chancellor's research fellow at RMIT University, investigated the financialization of rental housing in the private real estate market. She expressed her concern regarding the paucity of literature on the provision of social or affordable housing provision, despite the significance of the expansion of the private rental sector on affordable housing. REITs are highly recommended as among the most reliable payers of dividends for their investors, particularly for pensioners and others who need safe investments. During the pandemic REITs thrived as they benefit from low mortgage rates and other CMHC grants and loans, and experienced significant growth in the private rental market in crisis. They convert older apartments to condos or higher rental units, and housing experts evaluate success of their business model is based on eliminating affordable rental housing.

In its 2016 second quarter report Canada Mortgage and Housing Corporation warned housing prices are overvalued in 9 Canadian markets, with Vancouver at high risk. Strong evidence of "problematic conditions" also continue to exist in Toronto, Calgary, Saskatoon and Regina, while in Ottawa "problematic conditions" are weak.

By Q3 2021, 37.1% of disposable income was needed to pay for housing costs, which represents an increase of 5.2 points in 2021, the highest ratio since 2008. In 2008, the average home prices were much lower than in 2021 and the interest rates were 5 points higher than the Bank of Canada's 2021 rate, which was near zero.

== Affordable housing for Indigenous communities ==
Housing is said to be one of a number of social determinants of health (SDH), along with poverty, employment, income, education, social support networks, physical environments, early child development, gender and social capital, that prevent Indigenous peoples in Canada (First Nations, Inuit, and Métis) from achieving health equity with other Canadians. According to a 2015 meta-analysis by a team of University of Alberta and Memorial University researchers, sources in their systematic review indicated that Indigenous peoples in Alberta were more likely to have a "limited affordability for dwellings" and to "live in dwellings with inappropriate housing conditions and private spaces." As of 2016, First Nations, Inuit, and Metis households lived in "inadequate and insufficient" housing; this was recognized as a critical problem across Canada.

Prior to the 1950s, Inuit lived semi-nomadic lives, moving from hunting camps to fishing camps. In the 1950s, federal government agencies promised Inuit quality housing to convince them to move into permanent hamlets across what was then part of the Northwest Territories. During the Qikiqtani Truth Commission undertaken by the Qikiqtani Inuit Association, Inuit testified repeatedly that the promises of quality housing were not kept. The government did not consult with Inuit in regards to "appropriate and affordable housing." The first federal rent-to-own housing program began in 1959 as The Eskimo Housing Loan Program, which offered low-cost 16' x 16' Rigid Frame poorly constructed buildings with no reflection of Inuit lifestyle, that were quickly called "matchbox" houses. The payment plan was for 7 to 10 years at $15 monthly. Even at this price these houses were unaffordable as most "Inuit subsisted on hunting and seasonal employment." With the collapse of the Loan Program in 1965, new complex rental systems administered by housing councils were introduced. As of 2021, in Nunavut there were 5,600 public housing units with rents geared to income managed by the Nunavut Housing Corporation (NHC) with more than 20,000 tenants. This is one facet of the way in which Nunavut has been addressing housing issues. Nunavut's housing challenges are complex and are dealt with using "multi-faceted approaches." This includes "trauma-informed policies and programs" which are necessary to respond to "intergenerational trauma from forced relocation and residential schools" which impact "socio-economic conditions in Nunavut." In a 2021 podcast, Mumilaaq Qaqqaq, a former MP for Nunavut, described the three-week tour to Nunavut hamlets to report on the housing crisis first hand. She reported on multi-generational families living in over-crowded, drafty, mould-ridden houses that had not been repaired or renovated in years.

Following in-depth media reports critical on the lack of action on the part of the federal government, a comprehensive study of Indigenous housing in Canada was commissioned resulting in the 1992 report, A Time for Action: Aboriginal and Northern Housing. The report said that about 50% of 70,000 houses on reserve houses were "unfit" as residences and called for the "immediate construction of 21,700 new homes." The report said that 6,700 homes needed to be replaced, while about 44,500 houses "required substantial repairs." The cost at that time was estimated at $2.1 billion.

Following 18 months of talks on improving access to housing, employment, health services, and education, the Government of Canada, First Ministers of the Provinces, Territorial Leaders, and the leaders of five national Aboriginal organizations signed a series of agreements in 2005, known as the Kelowna Accord with a five-year $5-billion plan to "improve the lives of First Nations, Métis and Inuit." It would have included $1.6 billion for housing. Housing on reserves is considered a federal responsibility due to treaty rights. In the first budget during the Premiership of Stephen Harper, who did not endorse the Accord made with the Whigs, the 2006 budget allocated only $150 million to finance housing, education, clean water, and other services for First Nations, Métis, and Inuit. The Harper government, instead, introduced a "market-based solution" to the housing crisis on reserves in 2008—the First Nations Market Housing Fund—to help individual First Nations households purchase homes on reserves with a goal of "25,000 privately owned dwellings by 2018". This action marked an effort to further emphasize the privatization of indigenous housing that had been initiated in the mid-1980s. Its aim was to lessen the federal government's role and responsibilities in housing matters for indigenous communities. In 2008, the federal government allocated a one-time investment of $300 million without consulting the First Nations about the introduction of a new housing concept. From 2008 to 2015 the fund grew to $344 million through non-housing investments. Administrative costs, stipends, and travel expenses total about $3.6 million per year, and over eight years, only 99 homes were built, indicating that the market-based solution was a failure. Pierre Poilievre was the minister responsible for the CMHC at that time, the agency that managed the Fund. Bernard Valcourt, then Minister of Aboriginal Affairs, was also involved.

== Home ownership in Canada ==
In 1981 the rate of home ownership in Canada was 62.4%, after dropping to an all-time low of 60% in 1999, it increased to 63.9% in 2000; to 68.4% in 2006, and 68.55% in 2021.

Since the 1990s, there was a rapid increase in the price of residential real estate, so the increase in home ownership also resulted in an increase in mortgage debt. According to a 2012 Bank of Canada (BOC) report, the BOC's affordability measure (AFF), which was based on the "ratio of monthly mortgage payments to disposable income (DI)", was "consistently favourable by historical standards" starting in the late 1990s. According to Mark Carney—the Governor of the Bank of Canada from 2008 to 2013—the demand for housing in Canada was consistent with housing supply. Carney warned in 2011, that even though measures of housing affordability in Canada were favorable in most cases—with some housing markets already severely unaffordable even at current rate—interest rates were at a record low. He raised concerns that Canadian household debt was high and therefore vulnerable to increases in mortgage interest rates which could cause housing affordability fall to "its worst level in 16 years." Affordability in the real estate market was increased partly because of labour market conditions that supported increased income and the low interest rates. The banking sector benefitted from the "strong credit growth" and higher loads of indebtedness that these homebuyers incurred from 2001 to 2011. However, concerns were raised about the very high household indebtedness which had reached c. 150% of debt-to-income ratio by 2012.

As of early 2020, about a third of all homes in Ontario and British Columbia were owned by investors also known as multiple-residential property owners. In Nova Scotia and New Brunswick investors own 40% of all residential housing units. Concerns have been raised that while the investors group provide a significant portion of rental housing supply but may also be responsible for the rapid escalation of residential properties. Scrutiny of this buyers group increased during the COVID-19 pandemic as the housing supplies reached crucial lows. The CHSP April 2022 data revealed that in urban areas, the median income of renters was $25,000 compared to FTHBs whose median income was twice as much, $50,000, in larger census metropolitan areas (CMAs) across Canada.

About one third of Canadians rent their homes. Ontario and British Columbia have a higher rate of residential property rentals.

During the COVID-19 pandemic, housing supplies—particularly affordable housing—dropped to historical lows. The average price of a home in Canada increased 17.1% to $779,000 in Q4 2021 compared to Q4 2020, according to a Royal LePage survey.

A 13 January 2022 Bank of Canada report examined three types of buyers in Canada, first-time home buyers (FTHBs), repeat homebuyers, and investors or multiple residential property owners. The CHSP April 2022 data revealed that in urban areas, the median income of renters was $25,000 compared to FTHBs whose median income was twice as much, $50,000, in larger census metropolitan areas (CMAs) across Canada. Nineteen per cent of the down payment towards purchase of the first home was gifted by a family member. Residential property owners are described as "repeat buyers" when they buy a new home while selling their old one; multiple residential property owners are described as "investors" if they purchase a new residence, potentially for rental income, while keeping their old one. Investors or multiple residential property owners, who may be individuals or entities, own properties as an investment including rental income, as a recreational property which may be as a source of rental income. The report describes investors as older, higher-income, and more indebted. According to the Bank of Canada report based on mortgage data, since 2014, FTHBs have been the largest group of homebuyers in Canada, representing about 50% of all mortgaged home purchases; repeat homebuyers represented 31%, and investors represented 19% since 2014. During the pandemic, FTHBs represented 47% in June 2021, compared to 53% in 2015. The Bank of Canada reported a "rapid increase" in mortgage home purchases by all three groups, but the most pronounced increase was in the investors group.

According to Statistics Canada's Canadian Housing Statistics Program (CHSP) data for 2019 and 2020 on home ownership reported on 12 April 2022, which compared first-time home buyers (FTHBs) and multiple residential property owners, the latter own about a third of all residential properties in Canada. Of these the top 10% wealthiest represent 25% of residential housing value. While investors provide a significant part of the rental housing supply, they may also exacerbate the "so-called boom-bust cycles in housing markets" causing economic instability.

== Affordability problem ==
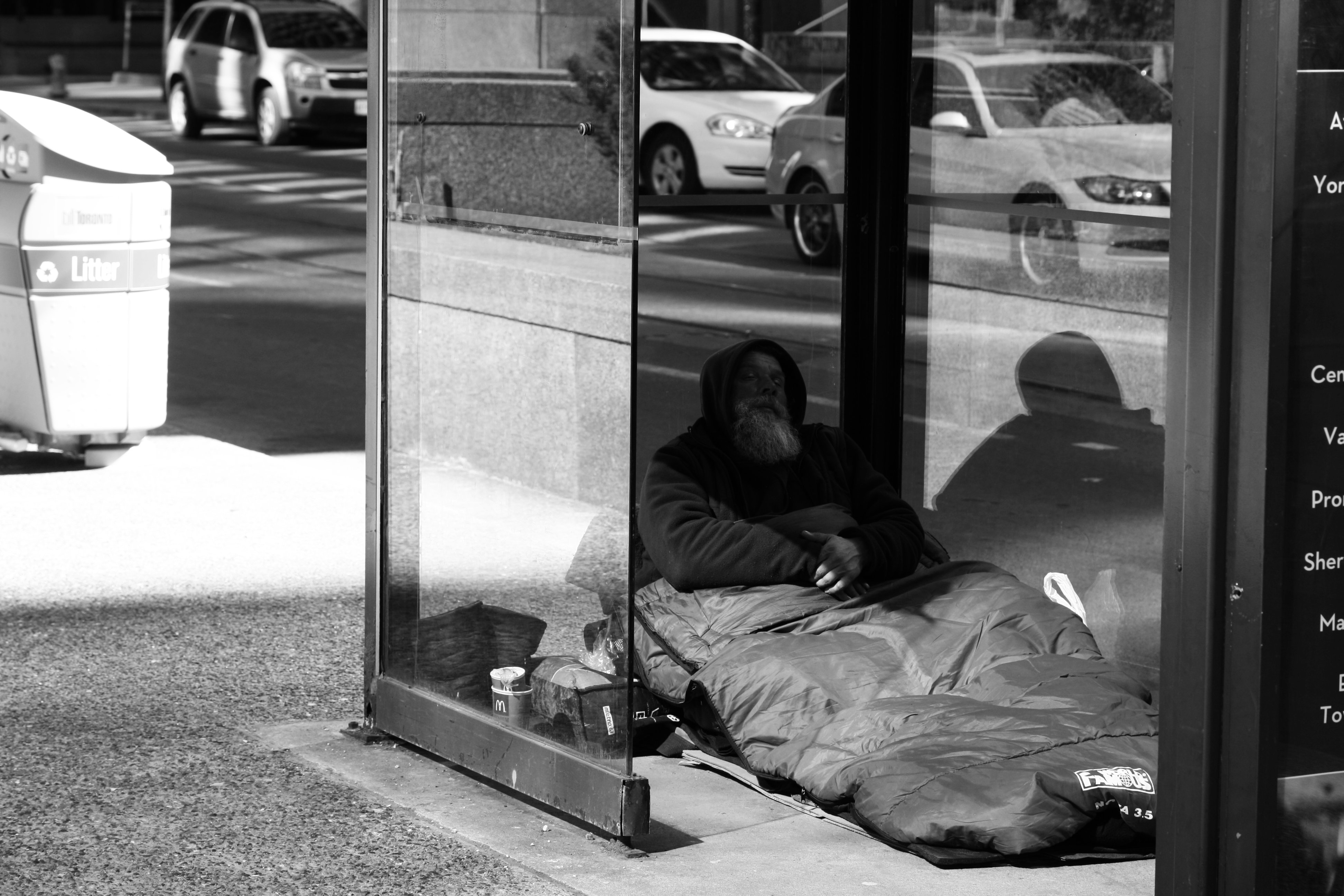
Homeless man living in a bus shelter in downtown Toronto (2010)

The mayors of Canada's largest cities declared the lack of affordable housing a national housing disaster in 1998. The federal government responded by announcing cost-shared conditional federal-provincial initiatives to construct affordable housing, worth $1 billion. However, during this period of tax cutting and debt reduction initiatives, the devolution of federal responsibilities to the provinces, without an accompanying transfer of funds, made it impossible for the provinces to contribute their share for affordable housing projects. Provinces were focused on reducing government size and increasing provincial tax cuts.

The United Nations Committee on Economic, Social and Cultural Rights issued a highly critical and detailed report on Canada's social policies in its 1998 review of Canada's compliance with these rights particularly about disastrous levels of homelessness. It concluded "that while Canada has a long history of housing successes, the housing cuts starting in the late 1980s have effectively prevented Canada from meeting its international housing obligations." Similar concerns were raised in their 2016 follow up report, which called for respect for the right to adequate housing. The Committee raised concerns about the housing crisis and the lack of a national housing strategy and funding, inadequate housing subsidies, the shortage of housing supply, and evictions and called for action on a number of issues. This included increase resources for housing at the federal and provincial levels, increase the supply of social and affordable units "substantially"; protect renters from evictions specifically in accordance with international laws regarding homelessness. The committee recommended that the federal government adopt a national strategy on homelessness.

All mortgages provided by federally regulated institutions where the down payment is 25% or less, are required under the federal Bank Act, to carry mortgage insurance, according to a 2005 Canadian Business journal article. In 2004, this represented 45% of all home buyers, or 500,000 Canadian households at a total cost of $1.6 billion for mortgage insurance which was paid to the CMHC, the Crown corporation that provides mortgage insurance. Based on the CMHC's 2004 annual report, mortgage insurance premiums collected totaled $1.1 billion while $51 million in claims were paid out, which represents less than 5% payout. From 1994 through 2004, CMHC paid out at approximately 45% which is much lower than most other kinds of insurance. The 2005 Canadian Business article cautioned that the CMHC's mortgage insurance program was the most "lucrative line of insurance in Canada." CMHC's government-backed mortgage insurance purchased at a flat, upfront fee for mortgage insurance through Canada Mortgage and Housing Corporation is obligatory for home buyers with down of less than 20% of the home's value."

in 2006, 5.5% of Canadians, 1.7 million people of a total population of 31 million were under-housed or non-housed.

In Canada's market based housing system, in 2010 the federal government intervened only when affordability of housing was stressed to the point home ownership became inaccessible even to individuals with full-time employment.

A Conference Board of Canada 2010 report entitled "Building From the Ground Up: Enhancing Affordable Housing in Canada" argued that the shortage of affordable housing was "having a detrimental effect on Canadians' health, which, in turn, reduces their productivity, limits our national competitiveness, and indirectly drives up the cost of health care and welfare." Stress, asthma, and diabetes are connected to inadequate housing.

There are concerns about aggressive marketing that began in the mid-1990s making secured personal lines of credit (PLCs) (often secured by housing assets) much more widely available. By 2011 secured PLCs represented 50% of consumer debt. This places many households in a vulnerable exposed situation if housing prices drop, mortgage rates rise, or their income decreases.

Concerns over high Canadian household debt levels led to changes to mortgage regulations announced June 2012 by Finance Minister Jim Flaherty. The federal government lowered the maximum amortization period for a government-insured mortgage from 30 to 25 years. The upper limit Canadian homeowners could borrow against their home equity was lowered from 85% to 80%.

The federal government's CMHC stated in 2021 that $2,225 per month constitutes "affordable" housing in Greater Montreal. This led to condemnation from both New Democratic Party and Conservative MPs. CMHC said that its principal goal was to stimulate new housing construction, not keep prices low.

=== Core housing need ===
In 1986, CMHC entered into Global and Operating Agreements under the National Housing Act and the CMHC Act, with the provinces and territories regarding administration and cost sharing of social housing programs. The core housing need concept was developed and adopted as an eligibility criterion to target households who were in need and as a basis to allocate federal funds through CMHC to participating provinces and territories. A household is considered to be in core housing need by CMHC if it meets certain criteria—if it falls below acceptable standards of affordability, adequacy, or suitability and if the cost of housing exceeds 30% or more of its before-tax household income.

Households are considered to have a housing affordability problem by CMHC if they have to spend 30% or more of total before-tax household income on shelter expenses. Shelter expenses include "rent and any payments for electricity, fuel, water and other municipal services" for renters and "mortgage payments (principal and interest), property taxes, and any condominium fees, along with payments for electricity, fuel, water and other municipal services" for home owners.

Data on core housing need is collected by Statistics Canada through the Canadian Housing Survey.

In 2006, Canada Mortgage and Housing Corporation (CMHC) deemed that 20% of Canadian households (1.7 million households) fall within the core housing need. These households could not find adequate and suitable housing without spending 30% or more of their pre-tax income. CMHC found that a disturbing 656,000 households (7%) spent at least half of their before-tax income on shelter in 1996, up from 422,000 households, or 5%, in 1991. While accounting for only 35% of all households, almost 70% of those in core need were renters.

In 2011, about 1.5 million Canadian households or 12.5% of Canadian households were in core housing need, and various levels of governance in Canada were exploring policy solutions to assist challenges faced by the low-income renter and homeowner overburdened with shelter costs.

The 2020 report on the 2018 Survey revealed that 1,644,900 Canadian households or 11.6% were in core housing need. Only 6.5% of homeowners experienced core housing needs compared to renter households, where 23% were likely to live in core housing need. Twenty one per cent of renters did not live in core housing need.

Core housing need does not measure progress against some measurable indicator.

== Public policy ==
=== National Housing Strategy ===
In November 2017, the federal government expanded its role in housing with the introduction of the National Housing Strategy (NHS) (NHS), with a human rights-based approach to housing. (Note: The Canada Mortgage and Housing Corporation (CMHC), a Crown corporation, with a mandate to "promote housing affordability and choice," reports to the federal Department of Housing and Diversity and Inclusion) The NHS's goal was "to ensure everyone in Canada has access to housing that meets their needs and that they can afford".

Prior to the NHS's launch, housing initiatives were introduced and funded by the federal, provincial, territorial and municipal governments, along with civil society organizations (including the charitable sector). In 2016, the federal Minister of Families, Children and Social Development said that strategies for a national affordable-housing strategy were being considered. Through this first NHS, the Government of Canada promised to spend $40 billion over the next decade on housing, funding that would go to build 100,000 new affordable units, repair 300,000 affordable units, and to cut homelessness by 50%.

Before 2017, Canada was the only G8 nation that lacked a national housing strategy.

In November 2017, Canada's 2017–2027 housing plan, One major outcome of the four-month-long Canada Mortgage and Housing Corporation (CMHC)-led consultation process—which included representatives responsible for housing at the federal, provincial, and territorial level—was a call for a National Housing Strategy that would "help vulnerable groups obtain secure, affordable housing".

In April 2019, the National Housing Strategy Act was passed in Parliament as part of the 2019 Budget Implementation Act, setting out the Government of Canada's housing policy. Based on a human rights-based approach to housing, the federal policy "recognize(s) that the right to adequate housing is a fundamental human right affirmed in international law." It also commits Canada to further the progressive realization of the right to adequate housing. This right is recognized in the International Covenant on Economic, Social and Cultural Rights (ICESCR).

By 2022, the first NHS introduced in 2017, was valued at more than $75 billion over ten years, funding programs through loans and grants such as the Community Housing Initiative, Reaching Home, Canada Housing Benefit, First-time home buyer programs, the Rental Construction Financing Initiative (RCFI), the National Housing Co-Investment Fund (NHCI), and the Rapid Housing Initiative (RHI).

The second National Housing Strategy (NHS) was launched in April 2024 with a budget of over CDN$82 billion. This included the 2024 Housing Accelerator Fund.

The government's investment in social housing is seen as a critical step to address the pressing needs of low-income households and to reduce homelessness in Canada. However, lack of affordable housing is becoming an increasingly serious problem in many urban areas of the country, and government's policy like NHS that was supposed to increase affordable non-market housing is used as a tool for funding corporate developers to build market rental housing with low-interest loans without any obligations to ensure housing rights of the largely affected population through rental control measures, annually building affordable housing units through a percentage of their profit from using the low-interest loans or converting a certain percentage of their market housing units in a development to non-market housing units.

As an unintended consequence in the process of providing affordable housing, NHS ended up supporting private developers for building market rental housing and turning Canadian homes into financial assets by generously providing low-interest loans. In 2023, the Canadian government's spending on housing was small, and only accounted 0.1% to 0.2% of the country's GDP. It is also projected to decrease as a proportion of GDP in the future. Critics have also observed that despite its establishment many years ago, there has been no comprehensive strategy or a significant implementation plan for the creation of dedicated non-market housing.

The Canada Mortgage and Housing Corporation (CMHC) is one of the main federal organizations responsible for administering the various programs and initiatives of NHS. It was supposed to efficiently administer seed funding, co-investment fund, the innovation fund, the federal lands initiative, and rental construction financing, as well as expanding the mortgage loan insurance to include market properties and flexibilities for affordable housing.

=== Affordable Housing Fund ===
On November 21, the 2023, the federal program formerly known as the National Housing Co-investment Fund (NHCF) was renamed the Affordable Housing Fund. The Fund offers low-cost CMHC loans for developers engaged in affordable housing projects. There was an increase in funding for affordable housing in the spring federal budget and in the fall of 2021, which included an additional $2.7 billion for the NHCF. The NHCF budget allocated $250 million to target housing for domestic violence survivors. As of 2021, the national non-profit association advocacy group, the Canadian Housing and Renewal Association, said that while more federal funding for community housing is the right step, the CMHC loan approval process is too slow.

=== Housing Accelerator Fund ===
The federal government's $4-billion Housing Accelerator Fund (HAF), launched in May 2023, is part of Canada's second National Housing Strategy (NHS). The HAF offers an additional $5 billion in infrastructure grants for provinces and territories, to encourage municipalities to implement pro-housing policies, with a main focus on the "missing-middle" homes such as duplexes, triplexes, and small apartment buildings. The targeted pro-housing policies focus primarily on the "missing-middle" homes such as duplexes, triplexes, and small apartment buildings. Launched in May 2023, the Housing Accelerator Fund (HAF) is a $4 billion initiative from the Government of Canada that will run until 2026–27.

== Affordability by province ==
=== Alberta ===
Calgary’s housing affordability varies sharply by income. In 2016, 78% of households met their needs in the market, 3% received government support, and 19% needed affordable housing. By 2022, about 84,000 households (20%) earned under $60,000 and spent over 30% of income on housing; 42,000 spent over 50%, and more than 3,200 people were homeless.

Despite high incomes and comparatively affordable ownership costs, Calgary has been described as Canada’s least-affordable city for low-income residents. Only 3.6% of Calgary housing was non-market in 2022. Financialized landlords’ subsidized retrofits have also contributed to rent increases beyond low-income tenants’ means.

=== Ontario ===
The non-profit Housing Services Corporation delivers programs for the affordable housing sector in Ontario. It was created under the Housing Services Act, 2011 to replace the Social Housing Services Corporation (SHSC) which was operational from 2002 until 2012.

The SHSC was created in 2002 following the devolution of responsibility for over 270,000 social housing units from the province to the municipalities to "provide Ontario housing providers and service managers with bulk purchasing, insurance, investment and information services that add significant value to their operations."

Over 20% of home owners residing in Ontario had housing affordability issues as of 2006. A 2010 survey by the Ontario Non-Profit Housing Association revealed that the number of households on affordable housing waiting lists was at an "all-time high of 141,635".

Through partnerships with the government, private investors became interested again in investing in multi-family rental housing in the 1990s. CAPREIT was established in 1997 becoming Canada's first REIT. As more REITs were created, more multi-family rental housing were owned by these institutions. By 2015, CAPREIT was Toronto's biggest landlord with about 11, 000 rental units. In the fifteen years between 2000 and 2015, the ownership of Toronto apartments was increasingly concentrated among REITs, institutional investors, private equity funds and some large family-owned firms.

On 29 January 2020, a motion to declare a housing and homeless emergency in Ottawa was passed unanimously by Ottawa City Council, becoming the first Canadian city to declare such an emergency. Faced with an urgent need for more affordable housing, new housing subsidies, and more assistance to those who are chronically homeless, to people who need supportive housing for a number of reasons—including those with disabilities or serious injuries—the city called on all levels of government to respond. The municipality provides 56% of funding for programs related to housing and homelessness, and the federal and provincial governments provide the remainder.

The price of the average home in most cities and towns in Canada increased by double digits. In Toronto, the increase was 15% breaching the "$1 million mark for the first time" in February 2021.

According to Reuters, by October 2022, the shortage of construction workers in Canada was a major factor in responding to housing shortage challenges, particularly in Ontario, British Columbia and Quebec. According to a June 2022 CMHC report, the labour shortage could contribute to making housing less affordable. The CMHC report said that in order to make housing affordable in Canada by 2030, millions of new homes had to be built.

The "More Homes Built Faster Act", which was introduced in November 2022 in response to Ontario's housing supply problems, raised concerns as it would make sweeping changes to a number of statutes.

=== British Columbia ===
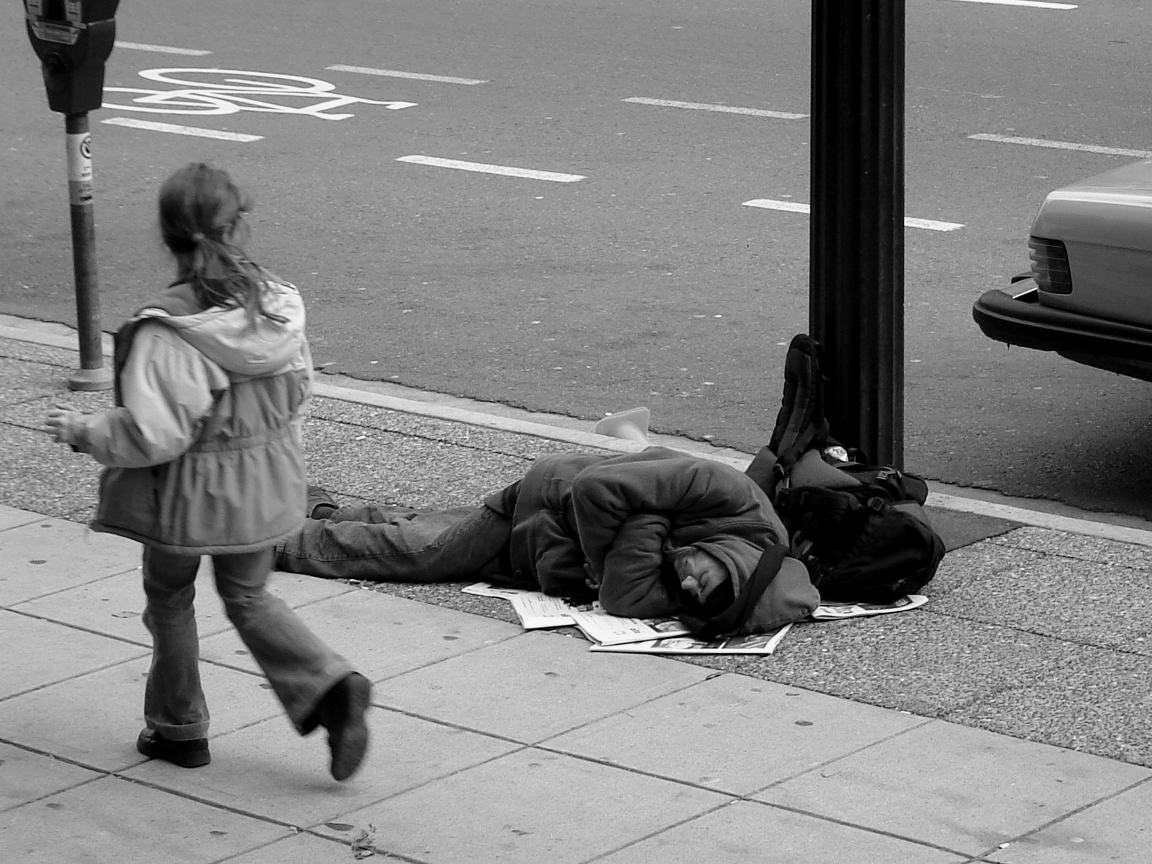
Unhoused man in Vancouver

Vancouver had the least affordable housing market in Canada by 1980; the average home cost 5.7 times the average family income. (Note: Statistics Canada, 1983a, table 7; Statistics Canada, 1983b, table 19.) O' Toole calculated that given the high interest rates in 1980, "an average family would have to devote more than 70 percent of its income to pay off a mortgage on an average home in 30 years." According to a report in The Economist, a factor contributing to Vancouver's high property prices may be Canadian laws which enable foreigners to buy Canadian property—possibly for purposes of tax evasion or money laundering—while shielding their identities from tax authorities, a practice which is known as snow washing.

The governor of the Bank of Canada noted that affordability of housing has been eroded as wealthy Asian investors seeking diversification and hard assets purchase housing in Vancouver. Consequently, "[t]he average selling price of a home in Vancouver is now nearly 11 times the average Vancouver family's household income, a multiple similar to those seen in Hong Kong and Sydney—cities that have also become part of a more globalized real estate market."

The 2006–2010 redevelopment of Vancouver's Woodward's building combined social and market housing, and has been credited with revitalizing Gastown in the Downtown Eastside.

Randal O'Toole of the Fraser Institute argued that the Greater Vancouver Regional District's 1996 "Livable Region Strategic Plan" prioritized curbing urban sprawl and protecting green space over affordability, contributing to the region's high housing costs.

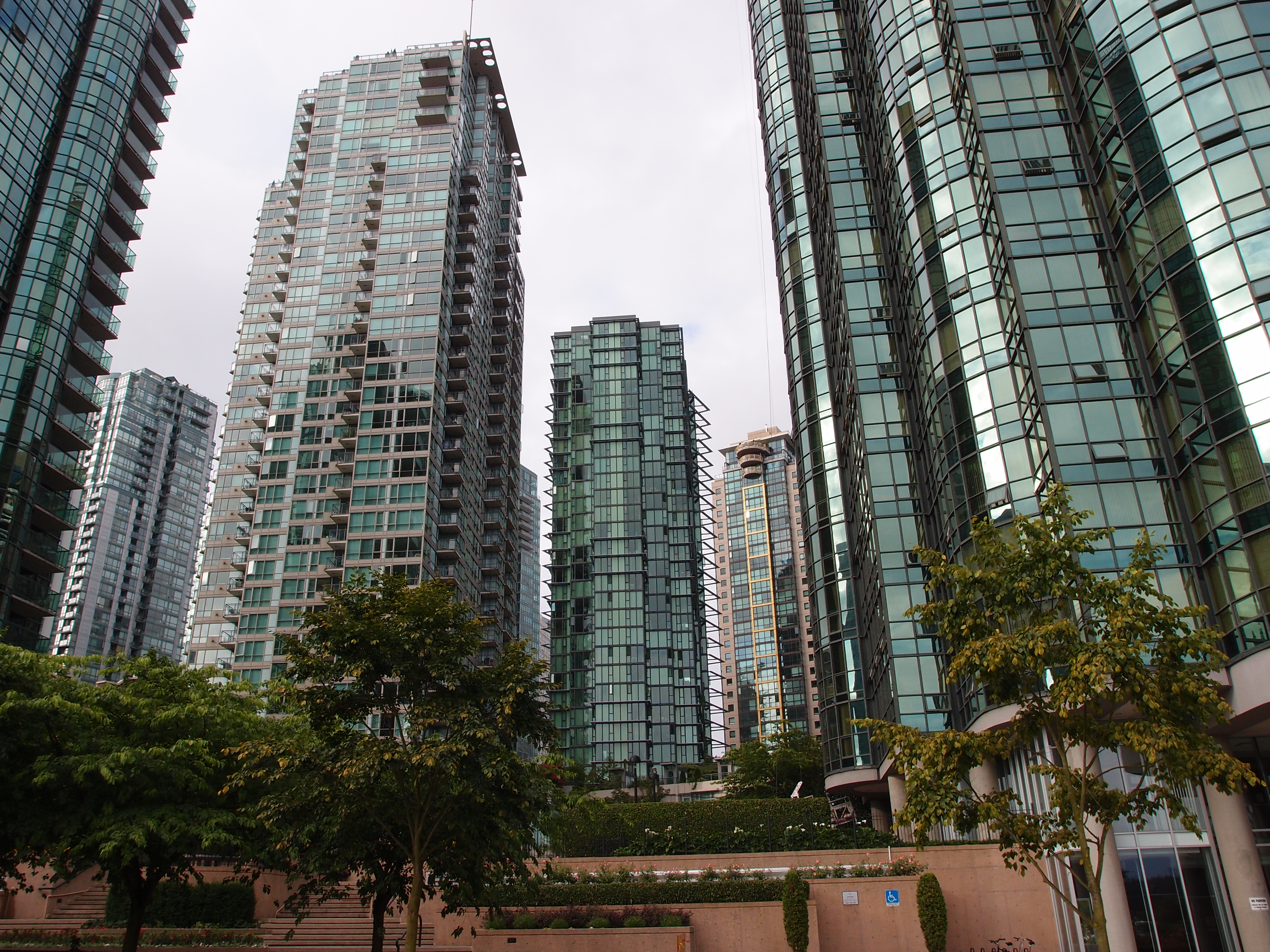
High-rise apartments in Vancouver

As of 2012 Vancouver was the most stressed area in the province in terms of affordability of housing in Canada. In 2012, Vancouver was ranked by Demographia as the second-most unaffordable in the world, rated as even more severely unaffordable in 2012 than in 2011. The city has adopted various strategies to reduce housing costs, including cooperative housing, legalized secondary suites, increased density and smart growth. As of April 2010, the average two-level home in Vancouver sold for a record high of $987,500, compared with the Canadian average of $365,141.

In June 2016, the youth-advocacy group Generation Squeeze declared housing affordability in British Columbia a "Code Red."

In 2016, the BC government announced a $516 million investment in 68 new affordable housing projects to build 2,900 units across the province, targeting renters with incomes that were low to moderate. This included 68 projects with 1441 units in Lower mainland and Fraser Valley, 774 units on Vancouver Island and the Gulf Islands, 256 units in Thompson-Okanagan, and the rest to Coast, Kootenays, Cariboo, and North/Northeast.

=== Nunavut ===
The capital of Nunavut faces an extreme affordability challenge mainly due to the supply side. In 2010 Iqaluit had the most expensive rental market in Canada: a two-bedroom apartment cost $2,365 a month in Iqaluit compared to $1,195 in Vancouver. In 2018, over 10,000 Nunavut residents were without housing of their own, translating to a deficit of 3,500 housing units.

== See also ==
- Affordability of housing in the United Kingdom
- Affordable Housing and Groceries Act, Bill C-56
- Affordable housing by country
- Beneficial ownership
- Bill 28 (British Columbia)
- Million Programme
- Public housing in Canada
- Snow washing
- Housing crisis in Quebec
