= Housing crisis in Quebec =

Quebec's housing crisis (French: crise du logement, pénurie du logement, or crise du marché immobilier) is a speculative bubble that has severely affected the prices, quality and availability of real estate for people in Quebec and Canada since the 1980s. The housing crisis has significantly raised rent as well. From 2018-2026, rent have nearly doubled across Montreal, Quebec City, and in many other places in the province. The average price for purchasing a home has risen from $48,715 in 1980 to $424,844 in 2021. The housing crisis was caused for several reasons, including the financialization of Canada's housing market, foreign purchasing of available housing (which was outlawed), and housing starts falling behind population growth. It also bears consequences for the quality of life of Quebecers and the economy of Quebec. As of 2026, municipal property assessments indicate that residential property values have continued to increase. A 2026 analysis of municipal roll data found that total assessed values have risen by about 55% since 2022. Assessed values may, however, lag behind current market conditions.

== Historical average for the price of a single-family home ==
| 1980 $48,715 (2,30 times more than the average revenue of $21,192) | 1990 $100,811 (2,81 times more than the average revenue of $35,822) | 2000 $113,291 (2,49 times more than the average revenue of $45,476) | 2010 $242,476 (4,09 times more than the average revenue of $59,237) | 2021 $424,844 (4,72 times more than the average revenue of $89,979) |

The average price of a single-family home doubles every 10 years, and salaries are not keeping pace with these increases. The low interest rates that took hold in the early 2000s, globalization and technology are all cited as having contributed massively to the surge in real estate acquisitions and the meteoric rise in prices.

== Cities in a critical state ==
Contrary to popular belief, the shortage is not at its worst in Montreal. The city most affected by this crisis is Granby, which in 2022 had a vacancy rate of 0.1%, followed by Marieville (0.1%), Rimouski (0.2%), Drummondville (0.2%), Rouyn-Noranda (0.3%) and Saint-Georges (0.3%).

== Causes ==
A variety of causes have combined to create and/or exacerbate the housing shortage in Quebec. These factors include: low interest rates, globalization, zoning, the large amount of rules for new construction, not enough new constructions to meet demand, low property taxes, high immigration, NIMBYs, corporations buying homes, Airbnbs, bidding wars, renovictions, real estate flips, snowwashing, the temporary foreign worker program, foreign students, and lack of government intervention and initiative, among others.

== Consequences ==
Real estate bubbles have many consequences on society. Quebec may be affected in these ways:

- High housing prices force tenants to live in a lower-quality apartment, thereby diminishing their quality of life. This has a negative impact on mental health.
- Families have less discretionary income.
- The crisis makes it difficult for young adults to leave the nest and move to a new city to pursue job opportunities.
- The crisis is causing labor shortages in some places as potential workers can't afford to move to the city.
- Businesses receive fewer investments.
- The problem increases the disparity between rich and poor.
- Birth rates fall as prices rise.

== Thesis of a systemic failure of public policy ==
For some observers, the housing crisis is caused by a systemic failure of public housing policies over several decades, and is linked to the federal government's decision to withdraw from housing construction in the 1980s. This thesis is echoed by former Canadian Deputy Prime Minister Sheila Copps. According to her, in the 1970s, federal housing policies saw the federal government become more directly involved in housing construction, including the development of housing for the elderly and aboriginals. This changed in the 1980s, when provincial governments assumed powers in housing policy. She argues that "when provincial governments got their money back (for housing), many of them didn't actually spend it on housing". She notes, however, that Quebec has often been the exception, using federal money to build social housing.

== Most affected populations ==
=== Indian Reserves ===
The housing crisis is particularly acute on Indian reserves in Quebec, but also across Canada. According to public data, "in 2011 [...], there was already an estimated shortfall of between 40,000 and 80,000 housing units on reserves. As a result, many Aboriginal people are living in overcrowded homes, with all the social problems this can entail". In a report presented to the UN General Assembly, Leilani Farha described housing conditions as "abominable". Indian reserves fall under federal jurisdiction and are not subject to legislative action by Quebec provincial legislators. That said, the Inuit of Quebec face similar problems, but they don't live on reserves, and their villages have municipal status.

=== Single mothers ===
Women who are single parents can find it difficult to pay for the rent and children on only a single income. Furthermore, many women who find themselves trapped in a dangerous situation, such as with a violent spouse, have no way out available to them because of the high cost of housing. Shelters are also as overcrowded and in demand as housing itself. In Canada, 43% of single-parent women have housing that is inadequate for their needs or that is unaffordable.

The introduction of new social policies, such as family allowances, health care, disability benefits and parental leave, are solutions proposed by governments that are not very effective in this case because they are based on a nuclear family model.

A better solution for single mothers is the creation of social housing. These are more suited to the needs of single mothers, and enable better integration into communities. However, its difficult to find funding or land for social housing.

== See also ==
- Canadian property bubble
- Flipping
- California housing shortage
- Affordable housing in Canada
- Affordable Housing and Groceries Act, Bill C-56
- Public housing in Canada
