= Bill 28 (British Columbia) =

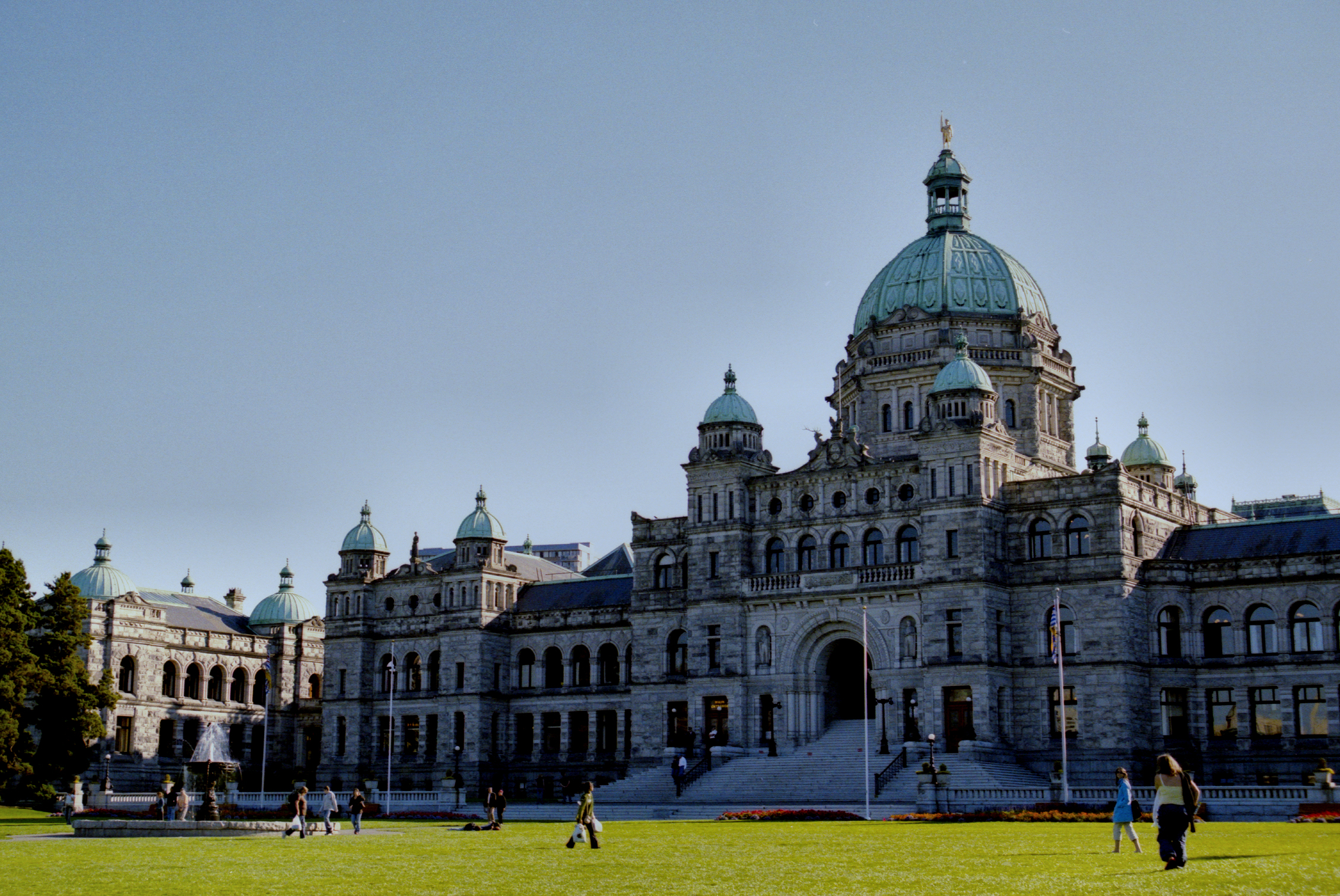

Legislative Assembly of British Columbia
- Citation: S.B.C. 2016, c. 27
- Assented to: July 28, 2016
- Bill citation: Bill 28
- Introduced by: Mike de Jong MLA, Minister of Finance
- Status: Current legislation

Bill 28, the Miscellaneous Statutes (Housing Priority Initiatives) Amendment Act, 2016, is a British Columbian law that came into force on August 2, 2016. The law was introduced after calls urging the British Columbia provincial government to intervene in the housing market and curb foreign investment that was seen as a major contributor to the rapid rise in home prices.

The Act has four parts:

- Vacancy tax: Amendments to the Vancouver Charter to enable the City of Vancouver to impose a municipal vacancy tax on vacant residential property
- Foreign-buyers tax: Amendments to the Property Transfer Tax Act, imposing an additional property transfer tax of 20% on all residential property purchased by foreign buyers
- Amendments to the Real Estate Services Act discontinuing industry self-regulation of the real estate industry
- Creating a new Housing Priority Initiatives special account to fund initiatives in respect to housing, rental, access, and support programs with the new tax revenues resulting from this law.

== History ==
Vancouver's housing crisis goes back decades. In the late 1970s a book was written by economist Gordon Soules on the subject. At the time Vancouver's ratio of real estate prices to local earnings was about 3 to 1. Soules interviewed Art Phillips, Bill Vander Zalm and Mike Harcourt for the book and all agreed that immigrants were driving up home prices and that the lax immigration to Canada rules should be tightened. Mike Harcourt also blamed Canadians from other provinces for the problem. Bill Vander Zalm blamed real estate speculators.

In 2016 Vancouver's housing was the third most unaffordable in the English-speaking world, with a ratio of real estate prices to local earnings of 13 to one.

Vancouver locals had been complaining for a long time about foreign citizens purchasing homes and displacing residents who find housing has become unaffordable and may end up being homeless. There was also a concern expressed that housing purchased by foreign citizens stays vacant. So, on Aug 2, 2016, the British Columbia government introduced Bill 28.

The act was introduced as a surprise move by the Liberal provincial government. It was announced and went through a first reading on July 25, 2016, without advance notice. It went through second reading a day later, and a final reading by July 29, 2016. It became law on August 2, 2016. The amendments relating to the Property Transfer Tax Act became effective August 2, 2016, while the other legislative amendments have come into effect on the date of royal assent or by regulation of the lieutenant governor in council.

=== Aftermath ===
According to Business News Network, Vancouver area sales dropped nearly 40 percent in October 2016 after the foreign buyers tax was introduced. Bloomberg News reported that Chinese international property portal Juwai.com saw Chinese buying inquiries in Vancouver drop by at least 25 percent. Questions of whether the British Columbia government was taking sides against the older homeowners in favour of younger buyers were raised. According to The Globe and Mail, a 2016 poll determined that a third of boomer homeowners were planning to sell their homes and move to other parts of British Columbia within the next 5 years, while only 16 percent of millennial residents would consider moving.

According to The Province, in 2016 Vancouver residential prices moved up 18 per cent overall, according to the Real Estate Board of Greater Vancouver, but cooled off just before the province imposed a 15 per cent foreign buyers tax in August. Towards the end of the year falling sales, and in some cases prices, dominated the housing market.

According to The Province, two Victoria city councillors, Ben Isitt and Jeremy Loveday, wanted the foreign buyers tax also applied in the capital region. In addition, they wanted local municipalities to be given the authority to impose a tax on vacant properties.

In 2018, the Foreign Buyer's Tax was extended to the Fraser Valley, Capital, Nanaimo, and Central Okanagan Regional Districts, at 20 percent.

== Speculation and vacancy tax ==
The Vancouver Charter was amended to enable the City of Vancouver to impose a municipal vacancy tax on vacant residential property. The number of homes sitting vacant in Vancouver is perceived as a problem. The province saw the tax as an important step in controlling the housing crisis in British Columbia, that has reported sky high rents and an extremely low vacancy rate.

A city report pegged the number at 10,800 vacant homes and condos in Vancouver. The thought is that if properties are rented instead of sitting vacant, housing affordability would improve. A proposal by Vancouver's mayor, Gregor Robertson, to tax vacant homes required a change to Vancouver's charter. Robertson is hoping to increase the number of available rental units by encouraging homeowners to put vacant homes up for rent. The vacancy tax will collect $30 million in revenue for its first year. This revenue comes from the owners of 1,200 properties because the majority of properties deemed vacant have either received an exemption, are disputing their vacancy classification, or have not made a declaration regarding the status of their property.

== Foreign-buyers tax ==
A new 20/15% tax was added to the Property Transfer Tax when a purchaser, who is not a Canadian citizen or permanent resident, purchases residential real estate property in Metro Vancouver. The tax was expected to add a large cost to foreign buyers of homes in Vancouver and increase tax revenue for the provincial government.

Government figures showed that foreign citizens, mainly Chinese, purchased $1 billion worth of real estate in British Columbia during a five-week period in 2016. When the tax was introduced, Premier of British Columbia Christy Clark said: "There is evidence now that suggests that very wealthy foreign buyers have raised the price, the overall price of housing for people in British Columbia." Foreign buyers were blamed by Tom Davidoff of the University of British Columbia (UBC) for large increases in real estate prices experienced in Vancouver. According to David Ley, also of UBC, taxing foreign citizens has slowed down rapid real estate appreciation in other countries.

== Real Estate Services Act ==
The Real Estate Services Act was amended to end self-regulation of the real estate industry in British Columbia.

== Housing Priority Initiatives special account ==
The Housing Priority Initiatives special account was created to hold the new tax revenues created by this law to fund initiatives in respect of homes rentals, access, and support programs. On September 14, 2016, The Province reported that the housing affordability plan would launch with almost half a billion dollars from windfall real estate taxes. The fund was to be used to increase housing supply in the Lower Mainland.

On September 16, 2016, Michael de Jong, Minister of Finance for British Columbia, announced that the government would spend $500 million on housing affordability.

== See also ==
- Chinese interest in real estate in the United Kingdom
- Foreign investment in residential property (Australia)
- Foreign Investment in Real Property Tax Act (United States)
- Foreign Investment and National Security Act of 2007 (United States)
