= Transnational organized crime =

Organized crime across national borders

Transnational organized crime (TOC) is organized crime coordinated across national borders, involving groups or markets of individuals working in more than one country to plan and execute illegal business ventures. To achieve their goals, these criminal groups use systematic violence and corruption. Common transnational organized crimes include conveying drugs, conveying arms, trafficking for sex, toxic waste disposal, materials theft and poaching. Efforts to prevent this type of crime is termed CTOC, (combating transnational organized crime).

== Definition ==
Given TOC's complex qualities, definitions may vary depending on the context. Generally, TOCs are organizations that engage in illicit criminal activities in more than one country with the intent of gaining influence or material benefit. TOCs come in a variety of forms and constantly change in structure. More often than not, they're a collection of groups part of a fluid international network or are part of a temporary collective of small organizations.

Some scholars may emphasize TOC's role as a product of capitalism and an "illicit counterparts of multinational corporations" by pursuing geographical positions from which to operate shipments, secure markets, and collaborate with trusted criminal entities. Other scholars associate TOC operations as a security risk affecting public safety, human rights, economic stability, government accountability, and exacerbating internal conflicts.

Article III, title: "Scope of application", section II of the United Nations Convention Against Transnational Organized Crime, defines transnational criminal activity under the following conditions:

“(a) committed in more than one state”; (b) committed in one state but a substantial part of its preparation, planning, direction or control takes place in another state; (c) committed in one state but involves an organized criminal group that engages in criminal activities in more than one state; (d) committed in one state but has substantial effects in another state.”

== History ==
Prior to World War I, several organizations were created to formalize international police cooperation, but most quickly failed, primarily because public police institutions were not sufficiently detached from the political centers of their respective states to function autonomously as expert bureaucracies. In 1914, the First International Criminal Police Congress was held in Monaco, which saw police officers, lawyers and magistrates from 24 countries meeting to discuss arrest procedures, identification techniques, centralized international criminal records and extradition proceedings. This organization appeared poised to avoid the political forces that ended earlier organizations, but the outbreak of World War I disorganized the Congress.

In 1923, a second International Criminal Police Congress was held in Vienna, on the initiative of Johannes Schober, President of the Austrian police. Schober, eager to avoid the politics that doomed previous international police efforts, noted that "ours is not a political but a cultural goal. It only concerns the fight against the common enemy of humankind: the ordinary criminal." This second Congress created the International Criminal Police Commission (ICPC), which served as the direct forerunner of Interpol. Founding members included police officials from Russia, Austria, Germany, Belgium, Poland, China, Egypt, France, Greece, Hungary, Italy, the Netherlands, Romania, Sweden, Switzerland and Yugoslavia. In 1926, the ICPC's General Assembly, held in Berlin, proposed that each country establish a central point of contact within its police structure: the forerunner of the National Central Bureau (NCB). In 1938, the Nazis assumed control of the ICPC and most countries stopped participating, effectively causing the ICPC to cease to exist as an international organization.

After World War II, Belgium led the rebuilding of the organization, with a new headquarters in Paris and a new name – Interpol. The United Nations did not recognize Interpol as an intergovernmental organization until 1971. On June 17, 1971, President Nixon declared "America's public enemy number one in the United States is drug abuse. To fight and defeat this enemy, it is necessary to wage a new, all-out offensive." With this declaration, the United States began the war on drugs. At the time, the flow of illicit narcotics into its borders was deemed a major risk to the health and safety of Americans, and as a result, enormous resources were spent in the effort to curtail both the supply of and demand for illegal drugs. In the three decades that followed President Nixon's declaration, drug trafficking served as the dominant form of what the United States and many of its allies viewed as transnational organized crime.

In recent years, that viewpoint has changed. The character of transnational organized crime has changed in three major ways since the war on drugs began. Drug trafficking has become more diversified, criminal networks have harnessed new methods of conducting business, and the structure of criminal networks has changed. Organized crime has gone global, giving way to the term transnational organized crime. Global governance has failed to keep pace with economic globalization. Antonio Maria Costa, former executive director of the United Nations Office on Drugs and Crime, effectively summarized the change in TOC over the last quarter century by saying, "as unprecedented openness in trade, finance, travel and communication has created economic growth and well-being, it has also given rise to massive opportunities for criminals to make their business prosper."

== Causes ==
=== Globalization ===
Due to Globalization's impact in reshaping the modern international system, it's cited by scholars as one of the main factors contributing to the growth of TOCs in the late 20th century. Globalization, characterized by increases in economic interdependence, the emergence of the global financial system, and advances in technology and communications has diminished national barriers integral to the Westphalia nation-state system. This shift provided TOCs with new possibilities for criminality. Improvements in coordination for illicit operations decreased the likelihood of detection, and better management of cross-border business ties and outreach for new opportunities through innovations like high-speed travel, telecommunications, and the internet proliferated TOC entities and arranged them into complex criminal networks. Money laundering and other financial crimes link illicit and licit businesses creating new avenues for capital. In effect, domestic authorities are less capable of dismantling TOCs without international support, as targeting them in their local jurisdictions could result in a relocation of operations to different regions, countries, and even continents. TOCs can operate in various jurisdictions without a physical presence (e.g., internet scams).

==== Inequality ====
Scholars have conflicting views regarding the extent to which globalization has impacted international inequality in general. However, many claim globalization has impacted inequality on measures that affect organized crime and increases in criminal activity. The World Bank published a report suggesting that although developing countries have experienced economic growth, inequality within those countries (between individuals) has increased due to globalization. Studies suggest that high levels of inequality in a given location are correlated with the relative power of organized crime and the high levels of corruption from which they benefit. Phil Williams, Professor at the University of Pittsburgh and fellow at the Council on Foreign Relations suggested that "[Globalization's] disruptive effect has actually caused people to have to go into organized crime and operate in illicit markets as coping mechanisms."

Citizens in developing countries may experience relative deprivation, or the perception of poverty relative to others rather than absolute poverty, becoming a motivator for criminal pursuits in countries transition to a free market.

==== Law Enforcement and Imprisonment ====
During the globalization process, developing countries pursue stricter rule of law policies and prosecution of criminal activities, attempting to ensure a suitable and stable environment for economic development and foreign investment. This includes the protection of property rights against criminal actions, professionalization of police, and increasing law enforcement capacities to confront organized crime, all of which are common in the transition to a capitalist free market. This resulted in a sharp increase in adult and juvenile crime rates as crime organizations are more likely to operate in developing countries with high levels of corruption and in regions distant from state interference.

Higher imprisonment rates may proliferate TOC activities as prisons are an essential recruitment network center for criminal enterprises. Detainees prove proper criminal credentials while serving their prison sentence and are given ample time to develop a relationship of mutual trust with members representing criminal organizations. This results in higher recruitment rates, improved vetting of new recruits, and the formation of new TOC ventures. One example is the Primeiro Comando da Capital (PCC), evolving a prison gang in São Paulo, Brazil, to a prevalent criminal organization operating on multiple continents.

== Effects ==
TOC is insufficiently understood, according to the executive director of the United Nations Office on Drugs and Crime. In the most recent full-scale United Nations assessment of TOC, conducted in 2010, the executive director states, "there is a lack of information on transnational criminal markets and trends. The few studies that exist have looked at sections of the problem, by sector or country, rather than the big picture. Without a global perspective there cannot be evidence-based policy." In response to the threat, law enforcement agencies have created a number of effective approaches for combating this transnational organized crime.

Louise I. Shelley (Director of the Terrorism, Transnational Crime and Corruption Center at George Mason University) has said:

Transnational crime will be a defining issue of the 21st century for policymakers – as defining as the Cold War was for the 20th century and colonialism was for the 19th. Terrorists and transnational crime groups will proliferate because these crime groups are major beneficiaries of globalization. They take advantage of increased travel, trade, rapid money movements, telecommunications and computer links, and are well positioned for growth.

== Types of crime ==
TOCs may be involved in various types illicit activities. Smaller organizations within a TOC network may operate these activities at a local/regional level while a larger organization arrange international logistics with the help of middlemen who facilities coordination between both groups. The most common types of crime include the following:

- Cybercrime
- Firearms trafficking
- The sale of Counterfeit medications
- Human trafficking
- Illicit Exploitation of natural resources (including illegal mining, crude oil theft, and illegal logging.)
- Illegal wildlife trade (including poaching and smuggling.)
- International Drug trafficking
- Money laundering (among other illicit financial activities.)
- Smuggling of migrants
- Organ Trafficking

== Relation to terrorism and insurgent groups ==
TOC is commonly linked to terrorist organizations, serving as patrons and as a reliable alternative to state sponsorship. Frequent transactions with terrorist groups engaging in asymmetric attacks include the sale of high-yield weapons that can inflict substantial damage to populations, as well as small firearms and common explosives.

In recent decades, organized crime and terrorist organizations have participated in overlapping illicit activities, leading to difficulty in categorizing them. Traditionally, motive distinguishes their categorization as terrorist organization's goals are ideological while a TOC entity's objective is to seek profits, and adopting the other's criminal activities is only a means to an end. Recent scholarship suggests that the intersection between both types of organizations is due to overlapping criminal networks creating hybrid forms of violent actors. Some scholars believe that this overlap proves convergence exists between both groups (e.g., terrorist groups will shift their agendas to profit-seeking resembling a criminal organization). In contrast, other scholars downplay convergence frequency among both groups due to differences in goals and motivations.

Hence, TOC entities may engage in acts of terrorism against governments and rival organizations depending on their political environment, motive, structure, and criminal enterprise. Traditional enterprises (e.g., Yakuza and Russian mafia) are only likely to get involved in political conflict to secure markets and increase profits since they desire minimal attention from the state. By comparison, narco-terrorist organizations (e.g., Mexican drug cartels) perform public warnings against perceived enemies through paramilitary violence that resembles an insurgent group targeting government security forces and citizens alike. Various criminal organizations engage in activities that overlap with terrorism, including the Tamil Tigers, FARC, Shinning Path, and the Abu Sayyaf Group.

== Combating transnational organized crime (CTOC) ==
Most illicit trafficking begins or ends in the world's greatest economic powers, such as the G8 forum. In other words, the world's largest trading partners are also the world's greatest markets for illicit goods and services. Many of these world powers have recently taken steps to combat TOC in a large, collective, international effort with partners and allies. Several organizations around the world have initiated efforts to combat TOC whose success or failure have yet to be determined.

According to the UN Asia and Far East Institute (UNAFEI), combating transnational organized crime (CTOC) relies first and foremost on effective investigative techniques and prosecutorial tools. Three techniques in particular stand out as the most important in combating transnational organized crime: electronic surveillance, undercover operations, and the use of confidential informants (CIs).

== Enforcement in the United States ==
=== White House Strategy to Combat Transnational Organized Crime ===
In May 2010, the White House released its National Security Strategy, detailing the need to aggressive combat transnational organized crime. This strategy document states, "Combating transnational criminal and trafficking networks requires a multidimensional strategy that safeguards citizens, breaks the financial strength of criminal and terrorist networks, disrupts illicit trafficking networks, defeats transnational criminal organizations, fights government corruption, strengthens the rule of law, bolsters judicial systems, and improves transparency. While these are major challenges, the United States will be able to devise and execute a collective strategy with other nations facing the same threats."

In July 2011, the White House released its Strategy to Combat Transnational Organized Crime, which reflects this change and sets forth a strategy "to build, balance, and integrate the tools of American power to combat transnational organized crime and related threats to national security—and to urge our foreign partners to do the same." This strategy document set out five overarching policy objectives consistent with the vision and priorities of the National Security Strategy:

1. Protect Americans and our partners from the harm, violence, and exploitation of transnational criminal networks.
2. Help partner countries strengthen governance and transparency, break the corruptive power of transnational criminal networks, and sever state-crime alliances.
3. Break the economic power of transnational criminal networks and protect strategic markets and the U.S. financial system from TOC penetration and abuse.
4. Defeat transnational criminal networks that pose the greatest threat to national security, by targeting their infrastructures, depriving them of their enabling means, and preventing the criminal facilitation of terrorist activities.
5. Build international consensus, multilateral cooperation, and public-private partnerships to defeat transnational organized crime.

=== Enforcement agencies of the United States ===
==== National Guard ====
In keeping with the U.S. National Security Council's strategy to combat transnational organized crime, the National Guard Bureau established the CTOC Center of Excellence (COE) to educate and train Combatant Commands, military services, federal agencies, state and local law enforcement, and community leaders.

Another approach the United States takes in CTOC is the use of multijurisdictional task forces that combine investigative resources from several agencies so that the strength and sophistication of a task force's capabilities are greater than any single agency. Collaboration among law enforcement agencies is a key element in discovering possible links between local crimes and crimes with a transnational component.

The National Guard Bureau uses such an organization in CTOC. Its Multijurisdictional Counterdrug Task Force Training (MCTFT) program and its Western Regional Counterdrug Training Center provide the core of National Guard Bureau training and collaboration among law enforcement agencies at all levels.

==== United States Southern Command ====
As the lead U.S. agency responsible for directing illicit trafficking detection and monitoring activities, U.S. Southern Command (SOUTHCOM) conducts operational and tactical activities in support of whole-of-government efforts to combat transnational organized crime in the maritime approaches to Central America. SOUTHCOM focuses on strengthening the security capacities of U.S. partners in Central America.

Another primary focus of SOUTHCOM CTOC efforts is supporting the interdiction of drug trafficking. SOUTHCOM collaborates with other agencies and nations to support CTOC efforts through detection & monitoring, information sharing, and partner nation capacity building.

==== Department of Homeland Security ====
Charged with securing the United States, the Department of Homeland Security (DHS) plays an integral role in the U.S. efforts to combat transnational organized crime both at home and with partners abroad. DHS leverages and deploys numerous CTOC resources, while working closely with other federal, state and local agencies, foreign governments and partners in the private sector. Once TOC threats are identified, DHS works with partners to interdict them through strengthened interdiction, investigations, and prosecutions.

==== Department of State ====
The Bureau of International Narcotics and Law Enforcement Affairs (INL), an agency of the Department of State, conducts CTOC operations at home and abroad by strengthening police, courts, and corrections systems. These efforts reduce the amount of crime and illegal drugs reaching U.S. shores.

INL CTOC efforts include helping foreign governments build law enforcement institutions that combat transnational organized crime, including money laundering, cybercrime, and intellectual property theft to trafficking in goods, people, weapons, drugs, or endangered wildlife.

==== Department of Treasury ====
Under the Office of Terrorism and Financial Intelligence (TFI), the Financial Crimes Enforcement Network (FinCEN) functions as the financial intelligence unit (FIU) for the United States providing investigative support for government agencies to combat illicit financial activities both domestically and internationally. FIUs are central agencies that assist law enforcement by collecting and analyzing financial information within a country's jurisdiction. FinCEN cooperates globally with other FIUs and uses its regulatory authorities to limit further illicit activities by Transnational organized criminal groups within the financial system. Through FinCEN, the Department of the Treasury promotes international efforts to adopt international standards involving anti-money laundering and the combating the financing of terrorism (AML/CFT). Between 1994 through 1998, FinCEN led the Financial Action Task Force (FATF).

According to the Government Accountability Office in 2001, The National Security Council identified FinCEN as one of 34 Federal entities that it considered to have a significant role in the fight against international crime.

In 2012, the Department of Treasury imposed sanctions on four key transnational organized crime groups: Camorra from Italy, Brothers' Circle from Russia, the Yamaguchi-gumi (Yakuza) from Japan, and Los Zetas from Mexico.

==== Drug Enforcement Administration ====
The strength and sophistication of a task force's capabilities will be stronger than any single agency's if the task force is multijurisdictional, combining investigative resources from several agencies. The key element in finding out possible links between local crimes and crimes with transnational component is collaboration among law enforcement agencies. To illustrate further, Operation Trifecta, a 19-month transnational investigation led by the Drug Enforcement Administration (DEA), involved 9 Federal agencies and 67 State and local law enforcement agencies from 8 States. In 2003, it led to the arrests of some 240 individuals charged with transnational drug trafficking.

==== Federal Bureau of Investigation ====
Law enforcement agencies such as the Federal Bureau of Investigation (FBI) are employed by nation-states to counteract international organized crime. Serious international crime—such as crimes against humanity—may be investigated by the International Criminal Court, but that Court does not have the power to take suspects into custody, instead relying on the support of law enforcement and military force in relevant countries.

== International enforcement agencies ==
=== United Nations Convention against Transnational Organized Crime ===
On November 15, 2000, the United Nations Convention against Transnational Organized Crime (UNTOC) was adopted by the United Nations General Assembly and is appointed to serve as the most significant mechanism for fighting TOC internationally. The first of its kind, the convention identified TOC as criminal actions that cannot be sufficiently combated by pacts tailored to a single commercial enterprise.

Combating TOC internationally proves difficult because so many governments and economies benefit enormously from TOC. For example, the Russia government benefits from money gained through cybercrime and through ties between TOC and it energy exporters. China's economy also benefits from cybercrime as well as from counterfeiting. West African and Latin American politicians are either coerced by or maintain financially beneficial relationships with drug traffickers.

UNTOC ability to help combat CTOC is compounded by its inability to directly assist countries that are incapable of adhering to the convention's guidelines. Most countries agreed for a necessary, innovative, and more strategic approach at the 2010 conference of parties, yet to date no significant employment of tactics or policy has been determined. Voluntary contributions account for nearly all of UNODC's funding and the organization suffers from chronic funding and staffing shortages. This limits UNODC's overall effectiveness.

The UN General Assembly has also issued many resolutions to combat TOC; however, most have been ineffective because of their vagueness and irrelevancy.

=== Interpol ===
The idea of the organization known today as Interpol was born at the first International Criminal Police Congress, held in Monaco in 1914. It was officially created in 1923 with the name, International Criminal Police Commission, and renamed in 1956 with the name, Interpol. Today, it is the largest international police organization in the world and is made up of 190 member nations. Each member nation staffs a national central bureau that communicates and cooperates with other member nations. Its mission is "Preventing and fighting crime through enhanced cooperation and innovation on police and security matters".

The agency's number one priority is to maintain a secure global police information system between the National Central Bureaus of each member nation. In addition to this priority, Interpol provides round-the-clock support to police and law enforcement agencies of all member nations. It also continuously attempts to innovate and enhance the tools used to fight crime and it assists in the identification of crimes and criminals. Finally, it delivers high-level training, certification and accreditation to law enforcement personnel.

Like most international CTOC organizations, Interpol suffers from continuously high levels of underfunding. In 2010, it operated on roughly $75 million budget. Since it holds no authority to conduct independent investigations or to arrest suspects, it is only as strong as the host country's police force.

=== World Bank ===
With a membership of 188 nations, the World Bank is nearly the same size as Interpol (190) and although CTOC is not its primary mission, the World Bank does attempt to combat TOC by conducting assessments of anti-money laundering provisions and carrying out anti-corruption efforts. Its efforts are hindered, however, by the lack of concrete mandates and authorities. In a 2009 World Bank paper entitled, "Slavery and Human Trafficking International Law and the Role of the World Bank", the author states that "the World Bank’s mandate appears to permit preventive action", thereby lending doubt whether or not the World Bank is even permitted by UN mandate to involve itself in the fight against human trafficking.

Recognizing the detrimental impact on its mission, the World Bank made a $1.5 billion pledge in 2011 to help combat TOC in the coming years.

In another CTOC initiative, the World Bank is partnered with the United Nations Office on Drugs and Crime in the Stolen Asset Recovery Initiative (StAR). This initiative helps to recover corruption related proceeds by creating an effective and collaborative environment for global law enforcement policy development.

=== International Monetary Fund ===
The International Monetary Fund also conducts assessments of anti-money laundering provisions in countries.

=== Europol ===
Europol is the law enforcement agency of the European Union (EU) whose main goal is to help achieve a safer Europe for the benefit of all EU citizens. The organization does so by assisting the EU Member States in their fight against serious international crime and terrorism.

Europol officers hold no authority to conduct arrests but they support EU law enforcement colleagues by gathering, analyzing and disseminating information and coordinating operations. Europol uses the information to prevent, detect and investigate offenses, and to track down and prosecute those who commit them. Europol experts and analysts take part in Joint Investigation Teams which help solve criminal cases on the spot in EU countries.

=== Financial Action Task Force on Money Laundering ===
The Financial Action Task Force on Money Laundering (FATF), an initiative of the Organisation for Economic Co-operation and Development (OECD), is an inter-governmental body established in 1989 by the Ministers of its Member jurisdictions. The objectives of the FATF are to

set standards and promote effective implementation of legal, regulatory and operational measures for combating money laundering, terrorist financing and other related threats to the integrity of the international financial system.

To this end, the FATF developed a number of recommendations that have been recognized by law enforcement agencies around the world as the standard in the combating of TOC; specifically in the fight against money laundering, terror financing, and the proliferation of weapons of mass destruction.

To help combat CTOC, the FATF maintains a policy that has proven successful thus far, in which it "names and shames" that jurisdictions that choose to not cooperate with FATF. It also enlists the help of cooperating countries in the crafting of legislative frameworks used in the effort to combat money laundering.
