= CHRA =

CHRA may refer to:

- Canadian Human Rights Act
- Canadian Holocaust Remembrance Association, founded by Sabina Citron
- Canadian Housing and Renewal Association
- Center hub rotating assembly, a turbocharger component
- United States Army Civilian Human Resources Agency, an Army service component commands
