= Marie-Josée Houle =

Canadian housing advocate and musician

- Born: Val-d'Or, Quebec, Canada
- Occupations: Musician; activist; Federal Housing Advocate
- Years active: 2000s–present
- Musical career
- Genre: Folk

Marie-Josée Houle is a housing advocate and musician who lives in Ottawa, Ontario, Canada. On February 3, 2022 she was appointed as Federal Housing Advocate by Ahmed Hussen, the Minister of Housing and Diversity.

== Biography ==
Houle was born in Val-d'Or, Quebec, and grew up in Edmonton, Alberta.

=== Music career ===
Starting in the early 2000s, Houle hosted a radio show on Carleton University's radio station CKCU and was involved in many aspects of the Ottawa folk and independent music scene. In 2007, she released her first solo album, Our Lady of Broken Souls, recorded at Little Bullhorn Productions and produced by Dave Draves, which was nominated for a Best Folk Album award. Musicians featured on the album include Derek Loewen on drums and percussion, Aalya Ahmad on fiddle and Rob Skitmore on guitar and mando.

For her first show in Oslo, Norway, Houle opened for Norwegian sensation Girl From Saskatoon (featuring Arthur Holoein on double bass and Eirik Roald on cello). She quickly became friends with the band members and invited Holoein to join her for her first cross-Canada tour during the summer of 2007.

Her second release, Monsters (2008) was also recorded at Little Bullhorn Studios by Dave Draves and was completed in Oslo by producer Marius Gengenbach. The album featured the Norwegian musicians Arthur Holoien on double bass and uke, Eirik Roald on cello, Ulk Knudsen on piano and Ida Malin Sanden on soprano saxophone. Canadian musicians include Derek Loewn on drums, Dave Draves on piano, Neil Gerster on guitar, and Aalya Ahmad on fiddle. Monsters was nominated for a Best Folk Album award in 2008.

=== Housing advocacy ===
Starting in 2004, Houle began to get involved in housing advocacy and activism. She later became the executive director of Action Logement in Ottawa, an organization aiming to prevent housing loss.

On 3 February 2022, she was appointed to a three-year term as Federal Housing Advocate by Ahmed Hussen, the Minister of Housing and Diversity.
