= Canadian Housing and Renewal Association =

Canadian nonprofit organization

- Abbreviation: CHRA
- Formation: 1967
- Type: Housing Organization based in Canada
- Legal status: active
- Purpose: advocate and public voice, educator and network
- Headquarters: Ottawa, Ontario, Canada
- Region served: Canada
- Official language: English, French
- Website: The Canadian Housing and Renewal Association (CHRA)

The Canadian Housing and Renewal Association (CHRA) is a national non-profit association in Canada representing those working in (or concerned with the state of) affordable housing and homelessness in Canada.

CHRA's main objectives include:

- Keeping homes affordable
- Ending homelessness
- Renewing communities and
- Creating a sustainable-housing profession

CHRA aims to achieve these goals through its activities, including:

- Federal-level advocacy
- An annual congress
- Creating opportunities for members to share ideas and workable solutions
- Providing online and in-person learning opportunities
- Disseminating housing- and homelessness-related information to members and to the broader housing and homelessness sectors

== History ==
During the mid-1960s, a group of concerned urban renewal professionals in Toronto became members of the Upper New York State Chapter of the National Association of Housing Renewal Officials (NAHRO). From this nucleus, the Canadian Association of Housing & Renewal Officials (CAHRO) was formed in 1967. The original members of CAHRO were concerned with urban renewal; however, this changed with the development of a national membership and the introduction of the Neighbourhood Improvement Program (NIP). As stated in the CAHRO constitution at the time, the objectives of the association were:

"to promote understanding of housing, community renewal, housing development, programs and policies, and rehabilitation and property standards affecting the urban environment at the municipal level, and to promote this understanding through dissemination of information on legislation and techniques."

During the early 1970s, the membership was limited to several hundred. The annual conference was the only regular meeting, and correspondence consisted of a mailing before the annual meeting. This changed in 1977, when a newsletter (Communiqué) was sent to members at irregular intervals in response to new federal policy in housing. This newsletter (and other activities) were limited by resources derived from membership dues and a small profit from the annual conference.

In early 1977, the president of CAHRO approached the then-Central Mortgage and Housing Corporation (CMHC) requesting funding to establish a small national office with an executive director. CAHRO felt that unless the association had its own office, it could not become an effective municipal voice in housing. Initial meetings between the two agencies centred on this proposal; however, experience with similar operations led CMHC to suggest funding for a product-oriented agreement. In late summer 1977, CAHRO submitted a proposal to CMHC for funding of a national housing magazine. The proposal was formally agreed on in summer 1978.

In the agreement, CMHC agreed to fund CAHRO for two purposes:

- To produce a periodical on housing and neighbourhood revitalization and related activities
- Generating revenue to recover some of the costs of the publication, by promoting CAHRO membership and activities

Further specifications concerning the periodical were made. It was to be bilingual, national and published six times per year. In 1978, there were to be two issues. Furthermore,

"it will contain practical and technical information to address program delivery problems and improve skills; illustrations, analyses, news and comments related to the wide range of housing and rehabilitation issues and activities. It will review current resources material and provide an inquiry service to its readers who will primarily include the various public and private groups and individuals involved in the delivery of NIP and RRAP, and other related housing and rehabilitation activity."

Staffing interviews for the magazine were held in August 1978; by early September, three people were set up in the CAHRO national office in Fredericton, New Brunswick working on the first issue of Impact. During its six-year history, Impact communicated CAHRO's responses to government housing policies and positions, voiced housing-related issues and policies emerging at the municipal level, and published articles and opinions from across the country. In 1984, CAHRO moved to a national office in Ottawa and hired Heather Lang-Runtz as executive director and editor. With this move came the decision to create a national housing magazine that would not only disseminate information to members, but would also help increase the organization's capacity to attract new members and become a stronger advocate for improved housing in Canada.

In the fall of 1984, the first issue of Canadian Housing was published. In late 1988, stemming from a decision to broaden the scope of the organization from that of a program-specific lobby group toward a more broadly-based national housing organization focusing on housing affordability for Canadians, the name of the organization was changed to the Canadian Housing and Renewal Association (CHRA).

== CHRA today ==
From the beginning of the CHRA/CMHC funding agreement in 1978 through the early 2000s, CHRA sustained itself primarily by way of this funding. In 2009, in the midst of federal spending cuts it became clear that CMHCs funding for CHRA would be cut. The annual funding provided by CMHC to CHRA ended in December 2010. As of 2011, CHRA aims to replace its CMHC funding through budget-cutting, increased membership and revenue generation through its services.
