= Public housing in Canada =

Housing in Canada

Public housing policies in Canada includes rent controls, as well as subsidized interest rates and grants. Early public housing policy in Canada consisted of public-private lending schemes which focused on expanding home ownership among the middle class. The 1st major housing initiative in Canada was the Dominion Housing Act of 1935, which increased the amount of credit available for mortgage loans.

In 1938, the DHA was replaced with the National Housing Act. In 1945, the Central Mortgage and Housing Corporation was established with the mandate the NHA. In 1954 a National Housing Act amendment led to the creation of government-insured mortgage institutions, which sought to make loans more accessible for low income and rural households. During the 1970s several policies were implemented which focused more heavily on inexpensive rental accommodations, including the Assisted Rental Program and Canada Rental Supply Program. Following changing policies and budget cuts in 1993, responsibility for housing transferred from federal to provincial, municipal, and local jurisdictions.

Originally conceived as rent-geared-to-income housing for low and moderate income families that would eventually transition to market housing, public housing eventually became relegated to households in greatest need because of limited supply and changing community attitudes. High incidences of drug use, violence, and theft have been reported within many public housing communities in Canada. Low levels of academic achievement and high levels of teenage pregnancy have also been reported among the youth population of Canadian public housing units.

== History ==
=== The Dominion Housing Act ===
The Dominion Housing Act was the first major housing initiative in Canada. It was implemented in 1935 under Prime Minister Bennett for the purpose of responding to the housing shortage caused by the Great Depression. The government allocated $10 million to assist the DHA in providing mortgage assistance, as well as commissioning a study of housing needs in Canada. The act was administered through joint agreements between the Department of Finance and private lending institutions. The government provided borrowers with loans amounting to 20% of the value of their homes, in addition to the 60% which had traditionally been supplied by loaning institutions. The government also split the burden of defaults evenly with lending institutions, thereby enabling them to increase amortization periods and provide below-market interest rates. The Special Committee, which was commissioned to study Canadian housing, recommended that an independent agency be established for the purpose of administering the Act; however, the government didn't take any action to this effect. The DHA was abandoned in 1938, at which time it was replaced by the National Housing Act. Prior to its termination, the program supplied loans for the construction of 4903 homes.

Critics of the DHA argue that its market-orientation excluded low-income and rural citizens from participation. It is speculated that many of those who received DHA loans would have purchased homes regardless. In order to qualify for a loan, prospective homeowners had to ensure that the residence in question met building standards. Critics state that financial burden imposed through this requirement barred low income families from accessing the program (Belec, 1997). Critics also point to the geographic concentration of the program, stating that financiers avoided less-fruitful rural neighborhoods. Belec (1997) found that 50% of DHA loans were concentrated within Vancouver, Halifax, Montreal, Mount Royal, Ottawa, North York, Toronto, Brantford, and Kitchener.

The Home Improvement Act of 1937 operated in tandem with the DHA. The program provided recipients with subsidized loans for home improvement.

=== The National Housing Act ===
In 1938 Prime Minister Mackenzie King implemented the National Housing Act as a replacement to the Dominion Housing Act. The NHA authorized the federal government to make loans to limited dividend and local housing authorities, which could amount to a maximum of 80 and 90% of their construction costs, respectively. In exchange for this funding, local housing authorities had to fix rents so that they did not exceed 20% of the occupants' aggregate income; however, the NHA also stipulated that landlords could not incur a deficit through a rental agreement. The NHA enabled the government to make joint loans with approved lending institutions, so long as those loans equated to 70-80% of the construction costs of the project. Loan agreements stipulated the portion of debt that each party would incur if the borrower defaulted on his or her loan. A 1944 amendment revoked the right of the Minister of Finance to grant loans to local housing authorities. Clark, who was responsible for drafting the NHA, felt that the competition posed by public housing authorities deterred private investment.

In 1945 the Central [later Canada] Mortgage and Housing Corporation was created to administer the NHA as well as the Home Improvement Act. The CMHC was given $25 million in funding in order to stimulate housing supply through the private market The CMHC legislation stipulated that the corporation could supply up to 25% of the value of a loan, whilst private lending institutions would be responsible for the remainder. The lending institutions would receive credit under the Pool Guarantee Fund System based on the aggregate value of their loan. The CMHC president and creator, Mansur, opposed social housing and excessive government intervention in the housing market. The first CMHC Annual Report recommended that wartime price ceilings on rental accommodation increase by 18-22% in order to stimulate demand for mortgages and increase the supply of rental accommodation. In 1947 CMHC acquired Wartime Housing Limited, and sold 27 000 units to veteran occupants.

In 1948 several amendments were made to the NHA in response to the housing shortage The new NHA had a social housing provision which focused on senior citizens. The Rental Insurance Scheme guaranteed that landlords would receive sufficient income to offset operational costs and pay taxes. This same year, the federal government announced that price ceilings on rental accommodation would increase if the provinces didn't assume control of them. Provincial governments, with the exception of Saskatchewan, did not claim jurisdiction over price controls. Price increases and subsequent evictions occurred nationally. One study of 1058 Canadian households found that 27.2% had been evicted following rent increases.

In 1949 an amendment was made which facilitated joint CMHC-provincial/territorial loans in the creation of social housing. The province or territory in question would be responsible for funding 20% of the loan and the CMHC would fund the remaining portion. The federal government would be responsible for financing 75% of operating losses incurred through price controls and defaults. Critics of this policy focus on its impracticability given the lack of funding available to provinces and territories

In 1954, Mansur was replaced by Stewart Bates who created a new National Housing Act. The new NHA discontinued the provincial and private joint loaning policies, and instead, opted to stimulate home ownership by providing insurance to private companies Under this new policy the borrower would be charged a fee by the CMHC, which in turn would provide insurance to the lending company in question. If the borrower defaulted, the lending institution would forfeit property rights to the CMHC, which would then reimburse the lending company The insurance provided through CMHC enabled private companies to increase amortization periods, lower interest rates, and decrease down payment requirements. In 1954, loans to non-metropolis cities and towns increased by 23% relative to the previous year.

In 1956 the NHA was once again amended, this time, to allow the CMHC to purchase lands for redevelopment. The amendment included a residential building code. In the event that a home owner or occupier failed to meet these standards set by this code, the municipality would be granted permission to expropriate the property. In Vancouver, Moncton, Halifax, Toronto, Ottawa, and Montreal, large slum areas were cleared for the purpose of urban renewal. In 1965, Montreal officials estimated that 1779 families had been displaced throughout the duration of the policy. Advocates of this policy pointed to its successes in Calgary and Winnipeg, cities which had historically suffered from particularly severe housing shortages. Opponents of the 1956 NHA amendment state that the policy provided inadequate compensation and housing options to displaced families. Displaced families from Toronto and the Montreal neighborhood of Cote des Neiges reported an average monthly increase in mortgage fees of 44% and 62%, respectively. The clearance policy disproportionately affected immigrant populations in Vancouver and Halifax.

In 1967 the NHA was amended to allow mortgage interest to float freely at market rates, which subsequently led to an increase in available mortgage loans.

In 1973 the NHA was amended and the urban renewal scheme was discontinued. Several social policies were introduced under this amendment. The New Communities granted $185 million to the CMHC for the purpose of acquiring and redistributing residential land for development. The New Communities Policy was terminated in 1978, however, the land which was acquired during its longevity enabled the building of many cooperatives, including the West Humber Cooperative. The Rent Supplement Act enabled the CMHC to partner with private landlords, cooperatives, and not-for-profit associations to provide affordable housing. Under this act, CMHC would agree to fund the difference between market rental prices and rent prices geared to the specific occupant's income. The Canada Rental Supply Program provided interest-free loans for 15 years to developers who agreed to allocate a proportion of units toward social housing initiatives. In order to ensure that loans contributed to the provision of low income housing, the CMHC was restricted to giving loans amounting to $7500 or less per unit.

The Rental Rehabilitation Assistance Program was also introduced in 1973. Under the program homeowners and occupants in low income neighborhoods could qualify for small grants to be used for home repair. The Assisted Home Ownership Program was also introduced under the 1973 amendment for the purpose of enhancing mortgage accessibility for low income families. Under the program the CMHC provided subsidized interest rates to low income families, in addition to providing them with grants. In 1978 an NHA amendment discontinued the provision of grant money to these families, which led to a high incidence of defaults, and in turn, necessitated that the federal government provide financial assistance to the CMHC.

== Contemporary Canadian housing policy ==
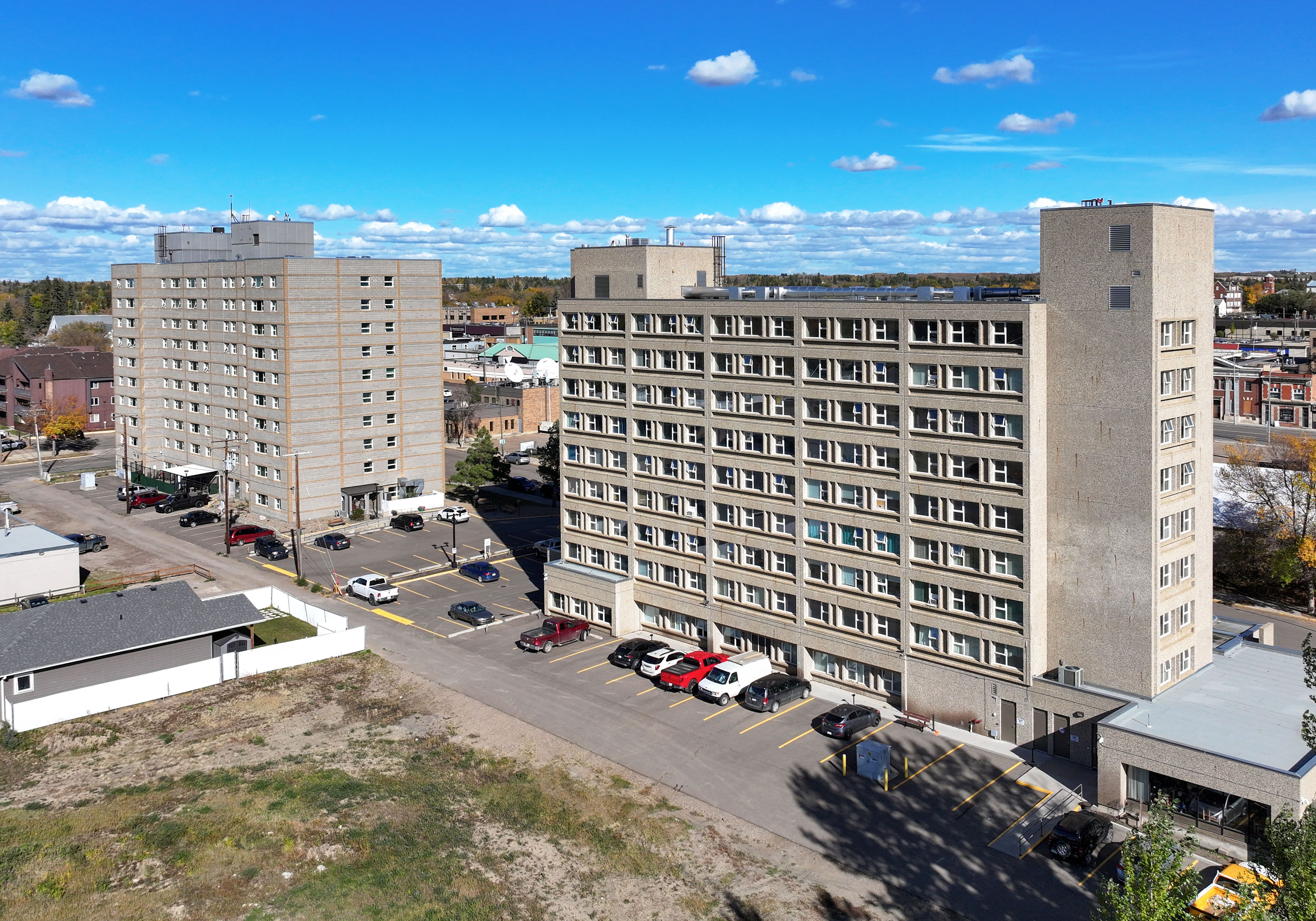
Valleyview Towers in North Battleford, Saskatchewan, built in the early 1980s as provincial social housing for seniors.

In 1993, the last federal budget tabled by Brian Mulroney’s Progressive Conservative government ended all new federal funding for social housing construction

Prime Minister Chrétien froze federal funding to new public housing projects, in addition to reducing the social funding made available to the provinces Quebec and British Columbia developed provincial policies, whilst the other provinces chose to transfer public housing authority to municipalities. In 2005 the Federal Government commissioned a $110 million study to examine the effects of homelessness on social expenditure The Housing First study has provided homeless people across Canada with accommodation and treatment services.

=== Ontario ===
In 1964 the Ontario Housing Corporation was created for the purpose of social housing management From 1971 to 1976, the corporation provided subsidized mortgages to 1200 rental occupants enabling them to become homeowners. As of 1996, the OHC managed approximately 85,000 units of housing and administered rent supplements to nearly 20 000 individuals. In 1995 the provincial government announced that it would no longer provide funding to finance new social housing project. In 1998 the provincial government abdicated itself of social housing authority which was given to municipalities. In 1999 a federal-provincial agreement was signed, which resulted in the Ontario government assuming responsibility for the province's Rent Supplement Program. In 2000, the Social Housing Reform Act was created. The Act replaced local housing authorities with a Local Housing Corporation which belonged to a provincial body.

Critics of the Ontario policy focus on the power asymmetries which exist between localities and provincial authorities. In Toronto, local councilors to develop social housing have been subverted by the Ontario Municipal Board when such projects conflict with business interests. Advocates of this policy state that government interference is inefficient and disrupts the larger housing market.

=== Quebec ===
In 1997 AccèsLogis was created by the Quebec Government for the purpose of constructing new social housing, as well as providing low-income citizens with access to subsidies In 2002 the Affordable Housing Agreement, a federal-provincial initiative, was created with funding from both parties. The AHA is administered by AccèsLogis with the mandate of providing not-for-profit corporations and local housing authorities with funding for social housing development. AccèsLogis has established partnerships with provincial lending agencies in order to guarantee loans for 30-40% of the expenses of many social housing developments. AccèsLogis is funded in part by local communities, which provide, on average, 15% of development funding. Critics of this policy point to cross-community disparities in social housing access, which they claim are caused by differences in funding availability based on community support. Advocates of the policy point to the fact that 23 000 units of housing have been developed as a result of the funding provided by AccèsLogis.

=== British Columbia ===
The British Columbia Housing Management Commission was created in 1967 in order to manage 8000 units of public housing, and negotiate further agreements with the federal government The commission also assisted in large redevelopment projects. In 1994 Homes BC was created in for the purpose of financing social housing. The project resulted in the construction of 3800 homes before its demise in 2002. In 2002 the C-Side in Coal Harbor was built in Vancouver using municipal funds. Once the building becomes profitable 50% of revenues are going to be donated to the city to support further investment in public housing.

== Living standards in Canadian public housing ==
=== Substance abuse ===
The frequency and intensity of drug and alcohol consumption among public housing residents are higher than the national average. One 2003 study of Ontario public housing units found that residents had better access to illicit substances, and were more likely to consume them than members of the control group. Participants in the study stated that they were motivated to get intoxicated because of a perceived hopelessness in finding an alternative lifestyle, and/or because their friends and neighbors were engaging in similar behavior. The same study also found that public housing residents were much more likely to be the victim of a violent or non-violent crime.

=== Disease ===
Public housing residents are much more likely than non-residents to suffer from physical and mental illnesses. A study of the Downtown East Side in Vancouver revealed that 18.4% and 17.3% of residents had HIV and Hepatitis, respectively. The mortality rate among Downtown Estate residents surpassed the provincial average by 5 times.

=== Childhood outcomes ===
Children who reside in social housing exhibit higher rates of adolescent pregnancy, behavioral disorders, and lower educational achievement. A 2009 study in Winnipeg found that 20.2% of the social housing sample experienced a teenage pregnancy, compared to 8.16% of those sampled from the general population. The same study found that only 45.3% of the social housing sample completed high school, compared to 82.4% of those from within the control group. Another study found that children from social housing units were more likely to witness parent depression and family dysfunction, as well as experience physical punishment. It was hypothesized that this exposure explained the high rate of behavioral disorders among social housing children, as well as their diminished cognitive abilities (Gange & Ferne, 2006). The same study revealed that boys in social housing were less likely to have hyperactive disorders.
