= Snow washing =

Hiding illegitimate financial transactions in Canada

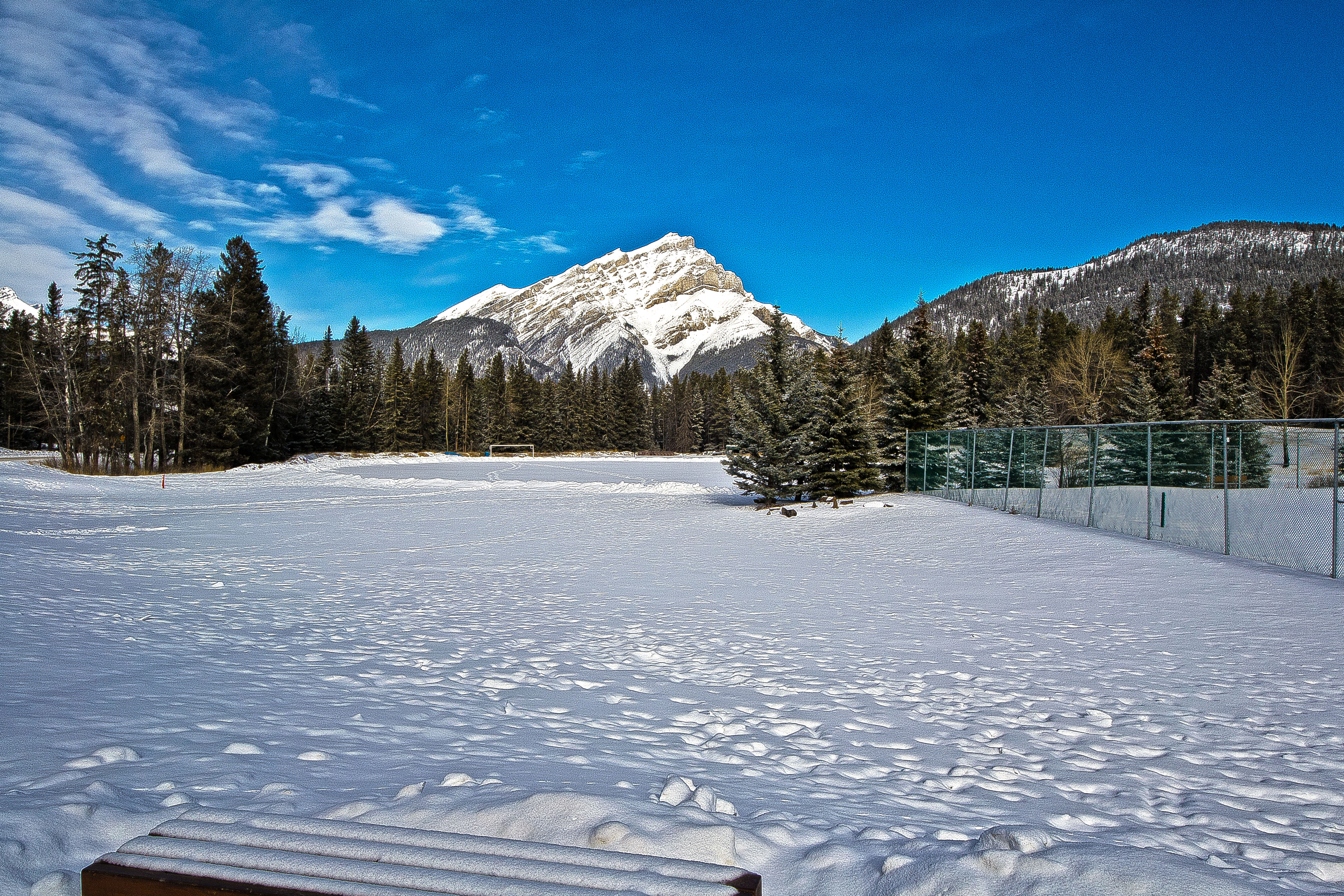
Canada is known for its cold winters and snow.

Snow washing refers to hiding illegitimate financial transactions often for purposes of tax evasion in Canada. The term is an amalgam of the words snow referring to Canada having cold snowy winters and washing referring to money laundering. It is easy under Canadian law to set up a company, even for a fee as low as C$200, while shielding the identities of the firm's real owners from the eyes of tax authorities. People, including criminals and foreigners avoiding economic sanctions, can set up shell companies to "make suspect transactions seem legitimate" under the cover of Canada's reputation for fiscal integrity.

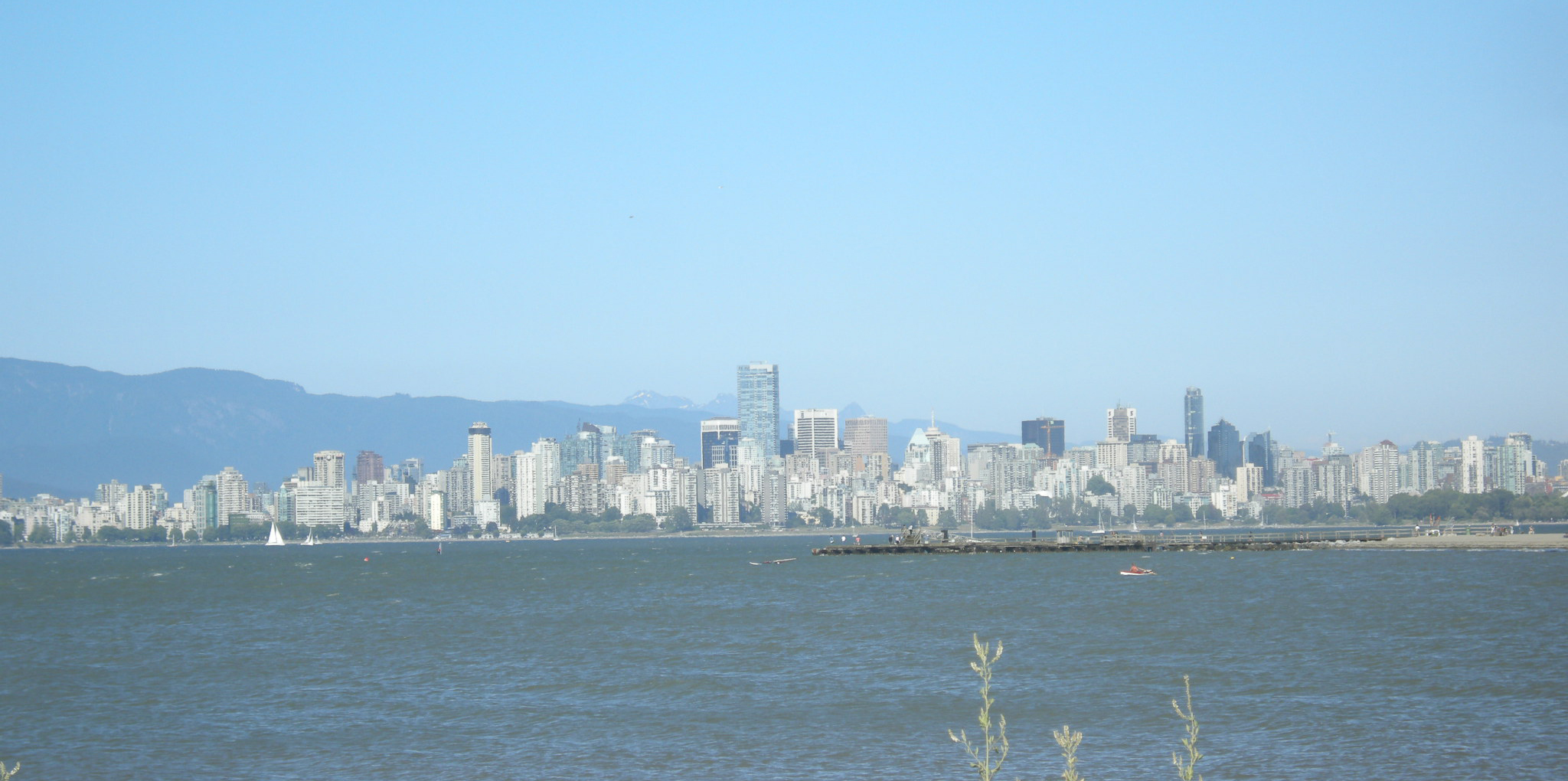
There are reports that many of the new houses bought in Vancouver are bought by anonymous foreigners as a way to evade taxes or do an end-around economic sanctions or launder money.

The registration systems for Canadian companies, at both the federal level and the provincial level, are shrouded in secrecy, which means that the real owner of a company or a trust can hire a person as a stand-in substitute to conduct all financial filings and submissions. The practice effectively makes Canada a tax haven along with countries such as the British Virgin Islands, Panama and the Bahamas. The process has been made even easier since the Canadian government has signed tax treaties with 115 countries. With a form of business organization called a Canadian Limited Partnership, the only persons who have to declare themselves to the authorities are the partners, and if they do not live in Canada, they are exempt from filing taxes in Canada. For firms whose stocks are not traded publicly, the rules require that only the directors of such companies be identified, and these directors are not required to reveal whether they are acting on behalf of somebody else. There was a report in The Economist suggesting that the overheated market for private property in the Canadian city of Vancouver may be partially the result of purchases by unidentified persons, possibly foreign criminals and corrupt officials, as a way to launder dirty money. One estimate in 2009 by the national police was that 15 billion dollars was being laundered annually in Canada because of the opaque disclosure requirements.
