= Foreign Investment in Real Property Tax Act =

United States tax law

- Other short titles: Comprehensive Oil Pollution Liability and Compensation Act; Medicare and Medicaid Amendments of 1980; Mortgage Subsidy Bond Tax Act of 1980; Omnibus Reconciliation Act of 1980; Revenue Adjustments Act of 1980
- Long title: An Act to provide for revenue reconciliation as provided by section 310 of the Congressional Budget Act of 1974.
- Acronyms (colloquial): FIRPTA
- Nicknames: Revenue Reconciliation Act of 1980
- Enacted by: the 96th United States Congress
- Effective: December 5, 1980

Citations
- Public law: 96-499
- Statutes at Large: 94 Stat. 2599 aka 94 Stat. 2660

Codification
- Titles amended: 26 U.S.C.: Internal Revenue Code; 42 U.S.C.: Public Health and Social Welfare
- U.S.C. sections amended: I.R.C. ch. 1, subch. B §§ 101, 103, 103A; I.R.C. ch. 1, subch. B § 261; I.R.C. ch. 1, subch. N § 861; I.R.C. ch. 1, subch. N §§ 871, 882, 891, 897; I.R.C. ch. 21 § 3121; I.R.C. ch. 23 §§ 3304, 3306; I.R.C. ch. 33 § 4251; I.R.C. ch. 61, subch. A §§ 6031, 6039C; I.R.C. ch. 65 §§ 6411, 6429; I.R.C. ch. 68, subch. A §§ 6652, 6655; 42 U.S.C. ch. 7, subch. XVIII §§ 1395x – 1395lll

Legislative history
- Introduced in the Senate as S. 2939 by Ernest Hollings (D-SC) on July 2, 1980; Committee consideration by Senate Budget; Passed the Senate on July 23, 1980 (Passed); Passed the House on September 4, 1980 (294-91, in lieu of H.R. 7765); Reported by the joint conference committee on November 26, 1980; agreed to by the House on December 3, 1980 (334-45, in lieu of H.R. 7765) and by the Senate on December 3, 1980 (83-4, in lieu of H.R. 7765); Signed into law by President Jimmy E. Carter on December 5, 1980

The Foreign Investment in Real Property Tax Act of 1980 (FIRPTA), enacted as Subtitle C of Title XI (the "Revenue Adjustments Act of 1980") of the Omnibus Reconciliation Act of 1980, Pub. L. No. 96-499, 94 Stat. 2599, 2682 (Dec. 5, 1980), is a United States tax law that imposes income tax on foreign persons disposing of US real property interests. Tax is imposed at regular tax rates for the taxpayer on the amount of gain considered recognized. Purchasers of real property interests are required to withhold tax on payment for the property. Withholding may be reduced from the standard 15% to an amount that will cover the tax liability, upon application in advance of sale to the Internal Revenue Service. FIRPTA overrides most nonrecognition provisions as well as those remaining tax treaties that provide exemption from tax for such gains.

The 2015 omnibus spending bill significantly altered the FIRPTA.

== Overview ==
The United States tax law requires all people, whether foreign or domestic, to pay income tax on dispositions of interests in U.S. real estate (U.S. real property interests). Domestic persons are subject to this tax as part of their regular income tax. Internal Revenue Code sections 897 and 6039C were enacted in FIRPTA; the Act also made conforming amendments to other various provisions of the Internal Revenue Code.

Foreign people are taxed only on certain items of income, including effectively connected income and certain U.S. source income. Foreign persons, however, are not taxed on most capital gains. Internal Revenue Code section 897, as enacted by FIRPTA, treats the gain on a disposition of an interest in US real property as effectively connected income subject to regular federal income tax.

To ensure tax collection from foreign taxpayers, FIRPTA requires U.S. real property interest buyers to withhold 15% of the sales price. The seller may apply to the Internal Revenue Service (IRS) to reduce this 15% to the amount of tax estimated to be due.

FIRPTA applies in virtually all cases where a foreign owner of a U.S. real property interest disposes of that interest. Provisions of the law preventing recognition of gain generally do not apply unless the seller receives a U.S. real property interest in a qualifying nonrecognition exchange.

== History ==
Before 1981, foreign people (nonresident, non citizen individuals, and non-U.S. corporations) often were exempt from U.S. tax on sale of real estate in the nation. Congress passed FIRPTA to require all foreign people to pay tax on dispositions of any interests in U.S. real estate. The law specifically provided that its provisions took precedence over any existing tax treaties that provided otherwise.

== Persons and property subject to tax ==
Foreign persons are generally exempt from U.S. tax on capital gains.

Under FIRPTA, however, foreign persons are subject to tax on gains from disposition of U.S. real property interests (USRPIs).

- An interest in property is any direct equity interest in the property, such as a fee simple ownership, but does not include interests solely as a creditor. Thus, co-owners of property each hold an interest in the property, but a bank holding a mortgage does not.
- Real property is land, buildings, and land improvements. Generally, whether property is or is not real property is determined under U.S. tax law concepts, not state law. Thus, gas pumps and awnings at gas stations are not real property under U.S. Federal tax law, even though they may be realty under state law. For FIRPTA purposes, real property also includes unsevered natural products of the land (e.g., oil and gas in place in the ground, uncut timber, unharvested crops) and personal property associated with the use of real property.
- A United States real property interest (USRPI) includes shares of a U.S. real property holding corporation (USRPHC). A USRPHC includes any U.S. corporation if more than 50% of such corporation's assets were USRPIs at any testing date. Disposition of an interest in a USRPHC is subject to the FIRPTA tax and withholding but is not subject to state income tax. This may be compared with the disposition of a USRPI owned directly, which is subject to the lower federal capital gains rate but is also subject to the state income tax.

== Gain recognition ==
Taxpayers generally must recognize gain upon disposing property. Where the proceeds are received in more than one year, the gain is recognized proportionately over the years received.

Taxpayers exchanging property may not be required to recognize gain on certain transactions, such as like-kind exchanges, corporate formations, contributions to or distributions from partnerships, certain corporate reorganizations, and certain other transactions. FIRPTA provides that such nonrecognition provisions generally do not apply, and gain must be recognized. Two exceptions apply. First, gain is not recognized if the property received in the exchange is a USRPI which, if disposed of immediately after the exchange, would be subject to FIRPTA. Second, the IRS may provide other exceptions in regulations. Temporary regulations providing very limited exceptions have expired. Regulations provide limited exceptions treating certain partnership interests as USRPIs, and thus nonrecognition.

== Amount of gain ==
Under general U.S. tax principles applicable to FIRPTA, gain is equal to the excess of the amount of money or fair market value of property received over the amount of adjusted basis of the property exchanged. Where the amount received is subject to a contingency, the amount is not recognized until the contingency is resolved.

== Tax imposed ==
FIRPTA gain is subject to tax as effectively connected income. Nonresident alien individuals are subject to tax on such income at regular graduated tax rates for U.S. individuals. The deduction for personal exemptions, certain adjustments to gross income, and most itemized deductions are not allowed. Foreign corporations are subject to tax on such income at regular corporate income tax rates. The branch profits tax under Internal Revenue Code section 884 may apply, subject to the branch termination exception. The alternative minimum tax may also apply.

== Withholding ==
As of February 17, 2016, buyers of U.S. real property interests are required to withhold 15% of the full sales price on any purchase of a USRPI; an increase from the previous 10% rate. However, the 10% withholding rate does remain in effect for personal residences valued above $300,000 and below $1 million. This is subject to only four exceptions. Withholding is not required:

- By a purchaser for use as a residence for a price $300,000 or less, OR
- Where the purchaser receives a statement from the seller that the seller is a not a foreign person.
- Upon acquisition of an interest in a nonpublicly traded domestic corporation where the corporation provides the required affidavit.
- Upon acquisition of shares of a publicly traded corporation.

To the extent withholding is required, the amount of withholding may be reduced below 10% of the full price only upon certification by the IRS that a reduced amount applies. Such certification is permitted only if the seller applies to the IRS for reduced withholding by filing Form 8288-B no later than the closing date of the sale. The certification will specify the proper amount of withholding, subject to the stated closing price.

Penalties apply to a purchaser who fails to withhold, file Form 8288 with the IRS, or pay the required withholding within 20 days of the sale.

== Treaties ==
Many U.S. tax treaties formerly provided exemption from tax for gains on dispositions of many sorts of U.S. real property. FIRPTA specifically provided that such treaty provisions would not apply after a particular date. Most U.S. tax treaties have subsequently been amended to conform with FIRPTA treatment.

== See also ==
Congressional Budget and Impoundment Control Act of 1974

== Resources ==
- IRS Publication 515
- Peters, Gerhard; Woolley, John T. "Jimmy Carter: "Omnibus Reconciliation Act of 1980 Remarks on Signing H.R. 7765 Into Law. ," December 5, 1980". The American Presidency Project. University of California – Santa Barbara.
