= Canada Mortgage and Housing Corporation =

Canadian national housing agency

- Société canadienne d'hypothèques et de logement

Agency overview
- Formed: 1 January 1946
- Superseding agencies: Wartime Housing Ltd.; Central Mortgage and Housing Corporation
- Headquarters: Ottawa, Ontario
- Minister responsible: Gregor Robertson, Minister of Housing and Infrastructure
- Agency executive: Coleen Volk, President and CEO
- Key documents: Canada Mortgage and Housing Corporation Act; National Housing Act
- Website: www.cmhc-schl.gc.ca

Canada Mortgage and Housing Corporation (CMHC; French: Société canadienne d'hypothèques et de logement, SCHL) is Canada's federal crown corporation responsible for administering the National Housing Act, with the mandate to improve housing and living conditions in the country.

Originally established after World War II to help returning war veterans find housing, it has since seen its mandate expand to the mandate of improving access to housing overall.

== Overview ==
The CMHC operates with a primary mandate of providing mortgage liquidity, assisting in establishing affordable housing development, and providing arms-length advice to the Government of Canada and the housing industry.

The crown corporation acts as Canada's national housing agency. As such, it administers federal housing programs such as the first-time home buyer loan, acts as a mortgage insurer (primarily for high-leverage loans), and provides housing research.

The agency's governance is led by an independent board of directors. However, the board is appointed by the Government of Canada and the agency is directly accountable to Parliament through the Minister of Housing, Infrastructure and Communities.

CMHC is the largest crown corporation in terms of assets, with CA$295 billion in assets as of the second quarter of 2021.

== History ==
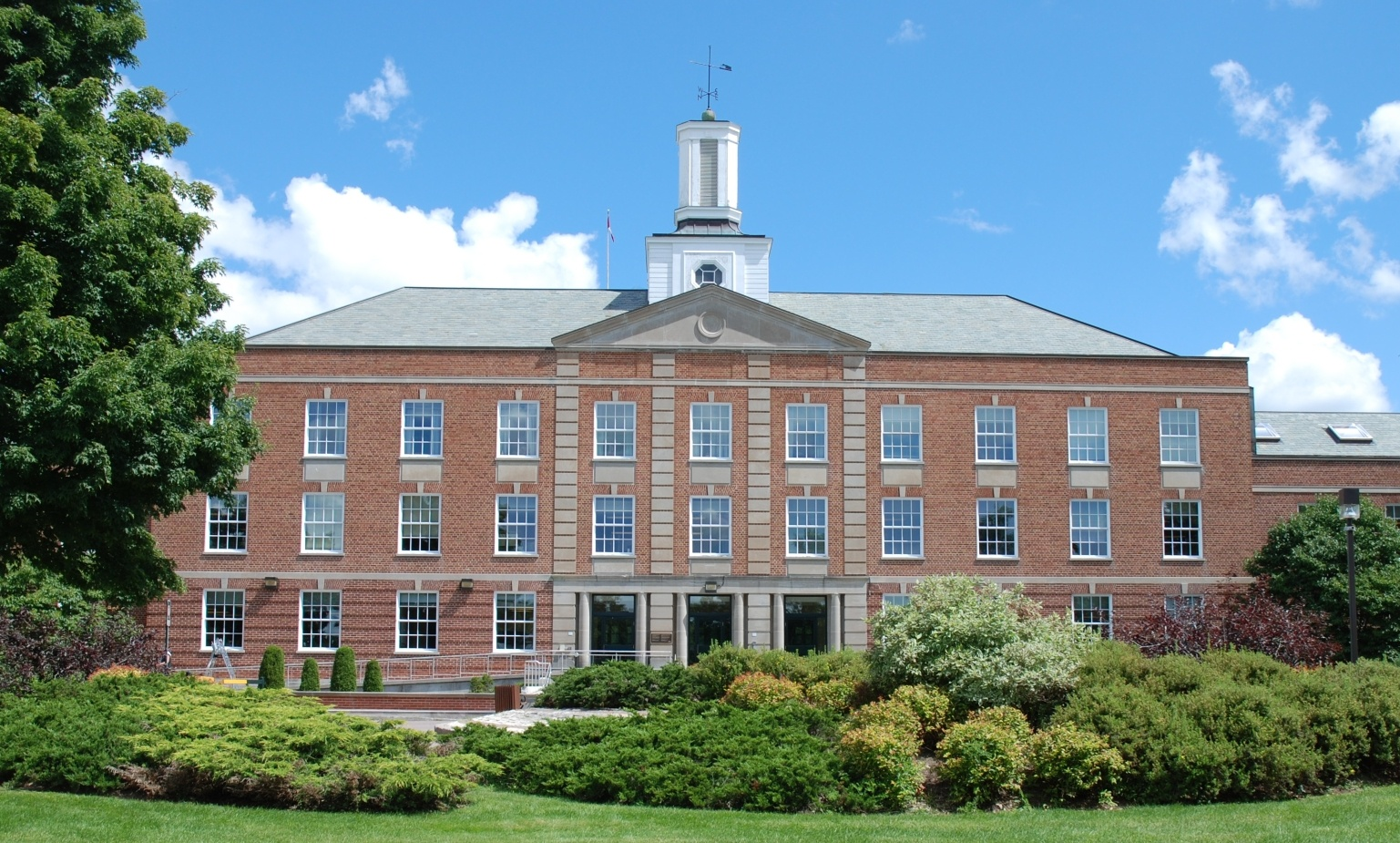
CMHC headquarters, at Montreal Road and the Aviation Parkway, Ottawa

=== Wartime Housing Limited ===
In 1941, the Government of Canada established the Wartime Housing Limited (WHL), a crown corporation that built and managed thousands of rental units for World War II workers and veterans. (Rural housing under the 1942 Veterans' Land Act remained with the Department of Veterans' Affairs.)

During that time, an Advisory Committee on Reconstruction study (aka the Curtis Report) described a tremendous need for low and moderate income shelter throughout Canada, and recommended a national, comprehensive, and planned housing program emphasizing low-rental housing.

By the end of the war, the Government of Canada attempted to anticipate post-war housing needs by revising the National Housing Act. In 1944, Finance Minister James Lorimer Ilsley introduced new legislation in Parliament "to promote the construction of new houses, the repair and modernization of existing houses, the improvements of housing and living conditions, and the expansion of employment in the post-war period." The Act received royal assent on 15 August 1944.

Evidently, rather than focus on low-income housing, the federal government instead initiated a post-war program between 1944 and 1945 that promoted home ownership and private enterprise.

=== 1945–1949 ===
By the end of World War II, serious housing congestion had developed in Canada's main cities due to major shifts of population among war workers and service personnel and to shortages of construction supplies and labour. The housing situation was exacerbated by the demobilization of the Armed Forces, the influx of war brides from overseas, the rapidly increasing family formation rate, and the continuing short supply of building materials and workers.

As such, there was an urgent need for a coordinated federal response to post-war housing shortages. This led to the creation of the Central Mortgage and Housing Corporation as the successor to the Wartime Housing Limited, consolidating almost all federal housing programs into a single agency.

In December 1945, the Central Mortgage and Housing Corporation was incorporated by act of the 19th Canadian Parliament, taking effect on 1 January 1946.

Its founding purpose was to find and create housing for returning war veterans and their families, as well as to lead Canada's housing programs. In broad terms, its three primary functions were to administer the National Housing Act, 1944, "to provide facilities for the rediscounting of mortgages by the lending institutions," and to administer the Emergency Shelter Regulations (taking over this responsibility from the Wartime Prices and Trade Board).

Along with administering the National Housing Act, it was also responsible for the Home Improvement Loans Guarantee Act and providing discounting facilities for loan and mortgage companies. The capital of the CMHC was set at CA$25 million (equivalent to $436,702,128 in 2025), and a reserve fund of $5 million ($87,340,426 in 2021) authorized to be accumulated from profits.

In 1946, CMHC built the Benny Farm in Montréal, Quebec, becoming one of the first subsidized housing developments in Canada.

In 1947, the WHL became an arm of the CMHC, transferring its 30,000 houses (called "wartimes") to the corporation to provide affordable housing for returning veterans.

Also that year, CMHC took over the financially unsuccessful Housing Enterprises of Canada Ltd, which was formed by major Canadian insurance corporations as a limited dividend company that attempted to build and manage moderately priced rental accommodation with CMHC's approval for location, costs, and rents.

Toward the end of the 1940s, the Government of Canada created a federal-provincial public housing program for low-income families, with costs and subsidies shared 75% by the federal government and 25% by the respective province.

==== Ajax, Ontario ====
In the late 1940s, CMHC transformed an abandoned munitions factory complex in Ajax, Ontario, into Canada's first fully planned, self-sustaining industrial community.

Following the beginning of WWII in 1939, the Government of Canada expropriated most of the farmland in what is now southern part of Ajax to establish the Defence Industries Limited Pickering Works munitions plant. The government-owned plant employed workers from different parts of Canada, and the site—along with the residences and the facilities established for the munitions workers—evolved into a self-contained community constructed and operated by WHL.

In 1948, the government mandated the CMHC to develop the site and its surrounding area into a modern industrial town. The CMHC manager of the area, George Finley, planned new housing subdivisions, commercial centres, and industrial areas.

CMHC's biggest challenges in establishing Ajax as a functioning municipality were reimbursing Pickering Township and Ontario County for municipal services provided to Ajax and establishing an official plan for the growing community acceptable to relevant government agencies. After considerable controversy regarding land and water control, CMHC submitted a successful application to the Ontario Municipal Board in May 1950, making Ajax an improvement district.

=== 1950s ===
During the 1950s, housing quality concerns were added to the task of providing for sufficient quantity of housing.

Throughout that decade, the federal government provided grants to cities to encourage them to tear down derelict buildings and build municipally owned housing corporations. Regent Park in Toronto, Ontario, was the first urban renewal project, where 42 acres (17 ha) were cleared to build the 1056-unit, low-rent housing development in 1950. Habitations Jeanne-Mance in Montreal, Quebec, is another example. (For further examples, see List of public housing projects in Canada.)

In 1951, CMHC began implementing the first of many federal–provincial public housing projects with 140 subsidized rent-to-income units in St. John's, Newfoundland.

In 1954, the Government expanded the National Housing Act to allow chartered banks to enter the NHA lending field. CMHC introduced mortgage loan insurance, taking on mortgage risks with a 25% down payment, making home ownership more accessible to Canadians.

The banks thereafter began to issue mortgage loans with CMHC underwriting. If the individual receiving the loan went bankrupt then the bank who gave the loan would not lose money, but instead would be reimbursed by the government. As part of CMHC lending and insurance mechanisms, low-risk borrowers would have to pay insurance premiums if they wanted to borrow with small down payments.

=== 1960s ===
The 1960s marked CMHC's shift in focus towards municipal planning and development to help cities deal with rapid urban growth. As such, urban renewal programs to redevelop inner cities were funded throughout the decade.

During this period, for the first time in Canadian history, multi-unit apartment buildings were beginning to outpace housing starts for single-family homes. Increased Government partnership with non-profit organizations also started around this time.

In 1966, CMHC built the first cooperative housing project in Canada in Willow Park, Winnipeg.

In 1967, CMHC exported wood-frame construction abroad to construct 137 homes in Harlow, England, marking CMHC's first international project.

Also that year, CMHC funded the design and development costs of Habitat—designed by architect Moshe Safdie for Expo 67 in Montréal—which demonstrated higher-density housing and led to many advances in materials and construction.

Not all of CMHC's "community urban renewal" projects have been received positively, however. Several moves by CMHC, including the development of an overpass, in Hogan's Alley—Vancouver's only Black neighborhood—led to the displacement of Black Canadian residents by 1970 after the area was razed. Although the community was destroyed, the highway was never built after protests from neighbouring communities.

=== 1970s ===
In the 1970s, affordability became a major factor in the home buying process. To help make housing more affordable, lot sizes were reduced and the density of developments were increased. As result, neighbourhood and residential improvement programs encouraged the maintenance and improvement of existing communities.

In 1971, CMHC introduced the Assisted Home Ownership Program (AHOP) to appeal to first-time buyers and help low-income people attain homeownership. Also during that decade, CMHC turned its attention to Aboriginal and rural housing, introducing the Winter Warmth Assistance Program in 1971, the first of its kind to provide funds to Indigenous People for urgent repairs to housing in rural areas.

With preservation of historic neighbourhoods and downtown living also becoming a priority, in 1973, CMHC oversaw the transformation of Vancouver's Granville Island, a run-down industrial area, into a successful culture and tourism center.

In 1974, CMHC introduced the Residential Rehabilitation Assistance Program (RRAP) to repair substandard homes to a minimum level of health and safety and to improve the accessibility of housing for disabled persons.

From 1977 through 1988, CMHC administered the Canadian Home Insulation Program (CHIP) to encourage energy-saving retrofits.

In 1979, the Central Mortgage and Housing Corporation changed its name to Canada Mortgage and Housing Corporation. The Canadian Housing Information Centre (CHIC), Canada's largest housing library, was also established that year. 1979 also saw the Milton Park area of Montreal being converted into one of Canada's most successful non-profit low-income projects.

=== 1980s–1990s ===
In the 1980s, the federal government withdrew from the financing of public housing projects. CMHC no longer directed funds to municipalities for the building of housing projects. Some government housing funds and mortgage guarantees since then have been provided for individual projects.

In 1983, CMHC received the 1982 United Nations Peace Medal for promoting a better understanding among people of the Economic Commission for Europe countries as host of a study tour on housing, building, and planning.

In 1986, CMHC introduced Mortgage backed securities as an alternative to investing in individual residential mortgages. In 1988, CMHC established the National Housing Awards to recognize achievements in the field and share housing innovations and best practices.

The 1990s saw the development of "FlexHousing", barrier-free housing, and "Healthy Housing", a program of energy efficiency and resource conservation in home construction. Despite these advances, however, affordability remained a concern, particularly in the early 1990s as a result of the ongoing recession, layoffs, and socio-economic uncertainty.

In 1991, CMHC created the Canadian Centre for Public-Private Partnerships in Housing, aimed at fostering public–private cooperation in housing projects.

In 1996, CMHC introduced "emili", an automated insurance underwriting system to reduce application approval times.

In 1999, the National Housing Act and the Canada Mortgage and Housing Corporation Act were modified, allowing for the introduction of a 5% down payment—a change launched as a pilot in 1992, extended and finalized in 1999—removing a significant barrier for first-time home buyers. CMHC also expanded its activities internationally and launched the Canadian Housing Export Centre (later renamed CMHC International) to share Canada's housing resources with the world.

=== 2000s ===
In 2001, CMHC introduced Canada Mortgage Bonds, aimed at ensuring the supply of low-cost mortgage funding and keeping interest low.

In 2002, CMHC received the Conference Board of Canada's National Award in Governance in the Public Sector, presented to boards of directors that have demonstrated excellence in governance and have implemented successful innovations in their governance practices.

Homelessness, assisted housing, and Indigenous housing gained more prominence in the first half of the decade. In 2003, the federal-provincial affordable housing program began, with $1 billion in federal expenditure to improve affordable housing supply by an estimated 23,500 units.

In 2005, CMHC introduced a 10% "green refund" on mortgage loan insurance premiums for homeowners who buy or build an energy-efficient home, or who make energy-saving renovations to their existing homes.

CMHC also introduced two on-reserve loan insurance products during the first half of the decade, enabling Band Councils or Aboriginal persons to access CMHC-insured financing for the construction, purchase or renovation of single-family homes or multiple residential properties, and an insurance pilot designed to increase market housing on-reserve.

=== 2010s ===
As part of the 2016 federal budget, the Government of Canada announced several initiatives that CMHC will be delivering:

- Affordable Housing – A total of $1.4B over two years starting in 2016 broken down as follows: $504.4 million related to measures to support the construction of new affordable housing units, the renovation and repair of existing affordable housing, measures to support housing affordability such as rent supplements and measures to foster safe and independent living which are expected to benefit more than 100,000 Canadian households;
- $200.7 million to support the construction, repair and adaption of affordable housing for seniors which is expected to improve housing conditions for more than 5,000 low-income households;
- $89.9 million for the construction and renovation of over 3,000 shelter spaces for victims of family violence;
- $573.9 million for retrofits and renovations to existing homes provided under our Social Housing Activity to address the increasing demand for repairs, as well as improve efficiency and reduce energy use, lowering utility costs and making housing more affordable; and
- $30 million to help federally administered providers maintain rent-geared-to-income for low-income households living in social housing.
- Up to $500 million per year for five years to provide low cost loans to municipalities and housing developers for the construction of new affordable housing projects. This initiative would encourage the construction of affordable rental housing by making low-cost capital available to developers during the earliest, most risky phases of development.
- $208.3 million over five years to be invested in an Affordable Rental Housing Innovation Fund that would be used to test innovative business approaches – such as housing models with a mix of rental income and home ownership.
- Northern & Inuit Housing – $177.7 million over two years starting in 2016 to address urgent housing needs in the North and Inuit communities.
- On-Reserve – $137.7 million over two years starting in 2016 most of which would support the renovation and retrofit of existing housing and $10.4 million over three years starting in 2016 to support the renovation and construction of new shelters for victims of family violence in First Nations communities.
- Up to $30 million over three years, starting in 2016–2017, to help homeowners dealing with costly structural problems in their homes as a result of the presence of the mineral pyrrhotite in their foundations.
- $5 million for 2016–2017 to support internships for up to 625 Indigenous youth. The additional funding for CMHC's Housing Internship Initiative for First Nations and Inuit Youth (HIIFNIY) comes from the $165.4 million investment to expand opportunities for young Canadians under the Youth Employment Strategy announced in Budget 2016.

In the 2019 federal budget, the Government announced the First-Time Homebuyers Incentive (FTHBI) program to help first-time homebuyers realize the goal of homeownership. The program functions as a shared equity scheme in which the CMHC provides eligible participants with up to 5% of the purchase price of a resale home, and up to 10% of the purchase price of a newly constructed home. The program was initially introduced over a limited four-year term and was allocated $1.25 billion. However, the governing Liberal party has committed to expanding the program further and removing certain pricing caps to make the potential pool of Canadians eligible for the program significantly larger.

=== 2020s ===
In 2020, CMHC announced it would be rebranding to better reflect its changing mandate. One name under consideration was "Housing Canada".

At the beginning of the COVID-19 pandemic in 2020, then-CEO Evan Siddall warned home buyers that their support for homeownership "can't be unlimited." They followed one month later by tightening mortgage insurance qualifications. The minimum qualifying credit score was increased from 600 to 680, the gross debt service ratio was capped at 35% from 39%, and total debt service ratio was capped at 42% from the previous 44%. The move was highly criticized, with the CEO claiming "vested interests are strongest before they fall."

The CMHC only has the power to regulate its own borrowers, and not competing private mortgage insurers. The result of the increased qualifying criteria lead competition to acquire larger shares of the market. Sagen (formerly Genworth) subsequently replaced the CMHC as Canada's largest mortgage default insurer.

In July 2021, the CMHC reversed the decision to tighten the lending criteria for mortgage insurance. The new CEO said it was a "mistake."

== First-time home buyer incentive program ==
In the 2019 federal budget, the Canadian government introduced the First-Time Home Buyer Incentive program (FTHBI). The program, run via the CMHC, is a form of equity sharing intended to help first-time buyers with their down payments.

In the 2019 federal budget, the Government announced the First-Time Homebuyers Incentive (FTHBI) program to help first-time homebuyers realize the goal of homeownership.

Under this program, a "first time home buyer" is anyone meeting the following criteria:

- either Canadian or permanent resident of Canada
- at least 18 years old
- not owning any property anywhere in the world

Moreover, the spouse or common-law partner of the buyer should not have owned a home during the period that he/she was in the relationship with the buyer; and the property should be used as a principle residence within 9 months after the purchase of the property.

Though launched on 2 September 2019, the program only covers purchases closing after 1 November 2019. The buyers must repay the government aid over a period of 15 years.

Via the FTHBI, the CMHC provides eligible participants with up to 5% of the purchase price of a resale home, and up to 10% of the purchase price of a newly constructed home. In return, the CMHC retains an equity stake in the property and recoups the value of the loan when the home is sold, or after a 25-year term. With this equity stake the CMHC shares in any gains or losses to the value of the property, proportionate to its 5% or 10% equity stake.

The program was initially introduced over a limited four-year term and was allocated $1.25 billion. However, the governing Liberal party has committed to expanding the program further and removing certain pricing caps to make the potential pool of Canadians eligible for the program significantly larger.

This program can only be used for down payments below 15% (LTV > 85%). Eligible buyers must have a gross household income not exceeding $120,000. These, along with various other restrictions, limit the effective maximum price of an FTHBI-eligible property to $565,000. This is far below the median property prices in population centers such as Toronto and Vancouver, leading to concerns regarding the efficacy of the program in these areas. During their 2019 federal election campaign, the Liberal Party of Canada promised to expand this program to better help buyers in Toronto and Vancouver.

The program is unaffiliated with the Home Buyer Plan, which allows buyers withdraw from their RRSP to increase their down payment.

== Securitization ==
The CMHC engages in securitization of residential mortgages, under the provisions of the National Housing Act. This assists registered banks to be more liberal with lending policies, making it easier for residential buyers to obtain mortgages.

CMHC's securitization guarantee programs enable approved financial institutions to pool eligible mortgages and transform them into marketable securities that can be sold to investors. This generates funds for financial institutions that can be loaned to residential homeowners.

Securities sold to investors are Canada Mortgage Bonds issued by the Canada Housing Trust and National Housing Act Mortgage-Backed Securities issued by financial institutions. The timely payment of interest and principal on these securities is fully guaranteed by the Government of Canada, through CMHC.

There are nearly $500 billion worth of CMHC mortgage securities in force.

CMHC also administers the legal framework for Canadian covered bonds on behalf of the Government of Canada. Introduced in 2012, the framework supports financial stability by helping lenders to further diversify their sources of funding and by attracting more international investors, thus making the market for covered bonds more robust.

The full government guarantee extended to publicly securitized mortgage debt, and the low cost to lenders, means that there has been ongoing demand for the CMHC's securitization products. Today, CMHC holds a monopoly in the securitization of mortgage debt, and there is no viable private securitization market for mortgages in Canada. While many experts champion this government monopoly in Canadian mortgage securitization, citing the high prudential regulation and stringent public oversight, this model nevertheless means that the majority of securitized mortgage debt is registered on the federal government's balance sheet. In a May 2019 speech to the Canadian Credit Union Association in Winnipeg, Manitoba, Bank of Canada Governor Stephen Poloz revealed his support for the development of a private mortgage securities market in Canada that would compete with the public securitization programs of the CMHC.

== Other programs and initiatives ==
=== Policy and research ===
CMHC facilitates the development and implementation of federal housing policy in Canada. This includes the examination of housing finance trends and policy options for regulations, incentives, and securitization tools in the primary and secondary markets; the analysis of distinct housing needs of specific populations such as Aboriginal people, seniors, persons with disabilities, and low-income households, and how these needs can be addressed; and the identification of practical approaches to advancing sustainable technologies and practices in the housing sector.

CMHC provides regular housing market analyses and forecasts at the local, provincial, and national levels. These activities support informed business decisions, policy development at all levels of government, and housing program design and delivery.

The CMHC is also a member of the International Union For Housing Finance, and participates in global research and policy development for housing finance. The CMHC is also the host of the Housing Finance Symposium, an academic event to discuss global housing finance issues.

=== Mortgage loan insurance ===
Mortgage loan insurance is mandatory for federally regulated lenders in Canada when the buyer of a home has less than a 20% down payment. This insurance protects the mortgage lender against loss if a borrower defaults, and allows qualified borrowers to access homeownership at interest rates comparable to those offered to buyers with larger down payments.

As a public mortgage insurer, CMHC has a mandate to provide service in all parts of the country and for a range of housing forms. A significant portion of CMHC's mortgage loan insurance business is in markets or for housing options that are not served or less served by private mortgage insurers. In addition to being the primary insurer for housing in small and rural communities, CMHC is the only insurer of mortgages for multi-unit residential properties, including large rental buildings, student housing and nursing and retirement homes.

=== Affordable housing ===
CMHC, on behalf of the Government of Canada, invests approximately CA$2 billion annually to help reduce the number of Canadians in housing need. This includes significant funding for social housing. Ongoing subsidies are provided under 25- to 50-year operating agreements with housing groups who provide affordable housing to those in need. Approximately 80% of the existing social housing portfolio is administered by provinces and territories under long-term agreements with CMHC. The remaining 20% is administered by CMHC and includes the on-reserve portfolio and certain federally funded housing units off-reserve, such as housing cooperatives.

Also as part of the $2 billion annual investment, CMHC provides funding to provinces and territories under the "Investment in Affordable Housing" (IAH).

CMHC also supports affordable housing through low-cost loans to federally assisted social housing sponsors seeking to finance new projects on-reserve or to renew existing financing.

CMHC's Affordable Housing Centre works with the private, public and non-profit sectors to help develop affordable housing that does not require ongoing federal assistance.

=== MLI Select ===
Designed to promote affordable, accessible, and energy efficient housing in Canada for both existing buildings being retrofitted and the new construction of projects with 5 or more units. To do so, the program incentivizes housing projects that contribute to affordability, accessibility, and environmental sustainability. Projects earn points in these categories and may qualify for improved financing terms from their lenders such as higher loan-to-value ratios, longer amortization periods, and reduced mortgage insurance premiums. These features are intended to improve project feasibility and encourage investment in rental housing supply.

=== First Nations housing ===
Through CMHC, the Government of Canada provides funding each year to address housing needs in First Nations communities. CMHC's funding supports the construction of new rental housing, the renovation of existing homes, ongoing subsidies for existing rental social housing and an investment in capacity building for First Nations people living on-reserve.

CMHC's On-Reserve Non-Profit Housing Program assists First Nations in the construction, purchase and rehabilitation, and administration of suitable, adequate and affordable rental housing in First Nations communities. CMHC provides a subsidy to the project to assist with its financing and operation.

== See also ==
- Granville Island – managed by CMHC
- Rainwater harvesting in Canada
