= Jiggetts =

Jiggetts may refer to:

- Jiggetts housing assistance program or Family Eviction Prevention Supplement
- Jiggetts (New York legal case)

== People with the surname ==
- Dan Jiggetts, American retired football player
