= CIRS =

CIRS may refer to:

- CIRS (AM), a Canadian radio station
- Center for International and Regional Studies, an educational institution in Qatar
- Centre for Interactive Research on Sustainability, a building at the University of British Columbia
- Chinmaya International Residential School, a private boarding school near Coimbatore, India
- Composite Infrared Spectrometer, an instrument in the Cassini-Huygens spacecraft
- Interest rate swap, an interest rate derivative
- Chronic inflammatory response syndrome, an illness caused by immune system dysregulation.
