= Dream LeBreton =

Coordinates: 45°24′49″N 75°42′43″W

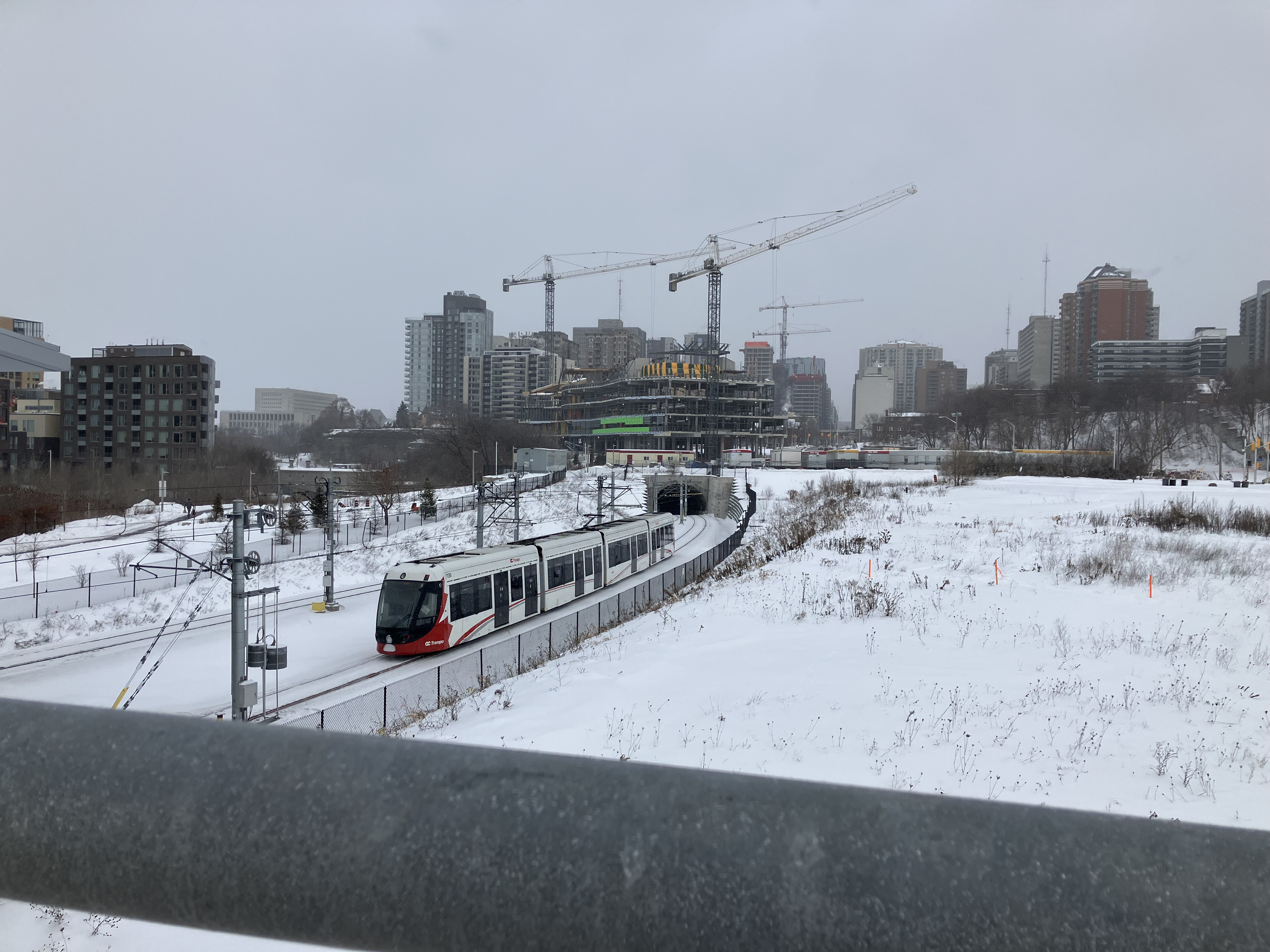
Dream LeBreton construction site.

Dream LeBreton is a residential project part of the NCC’s LeBreton Flats Master Concept Plan. The project consists of two city high-rise buildings just outside downtown Ottawa. The architecture firms involved in the project include Perkins & Will, KPMB Architects, which were supported by Two Row Architects and Purpose Building. The National Capital Commission selected the project through a design competition. The residences are part of a housing development initiative to generate sustainable, affordable housing in a developing area. The buildings include various types of condos while also including retail, food, health services, and a daycare. The buildings consist of 601 housing units, of which 246 will be affordable units, reaching 31 and 36 story's high and 721,000 square feet. The project launched in 2023 and is set to be complete by 2027.

== History of LeBreton Flats ==
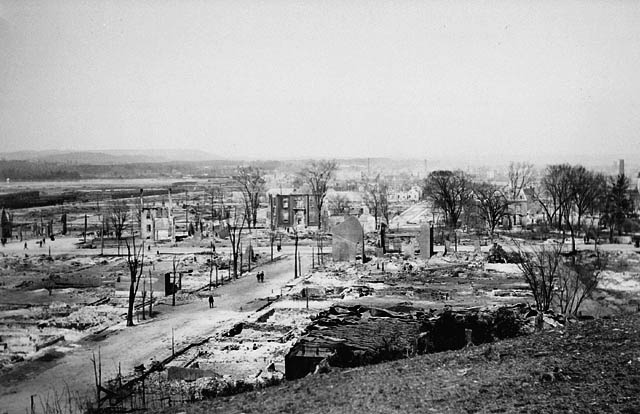
LeBreton Flats aftermath of The Great Fire

LeBreton Flats, within the nation's capital Ottawa, Ontario, was a place where many indigenous people gathered and held sacred ceremonies. The neighborhood is found within central Ottawa, nearing the downtown area. When European settlers arrived, in the 19th century, LeBreton Flats became a community. The community was home to thousands before the Ottawa Great Fire took place in 1900. Many of the buildings within the community were damaged due to the event. In the 1960s the Canadian government decided to expropriate people from their homes, and community due to the deteriorating conditions of buildings and the polluting environment.

== Building environment ==
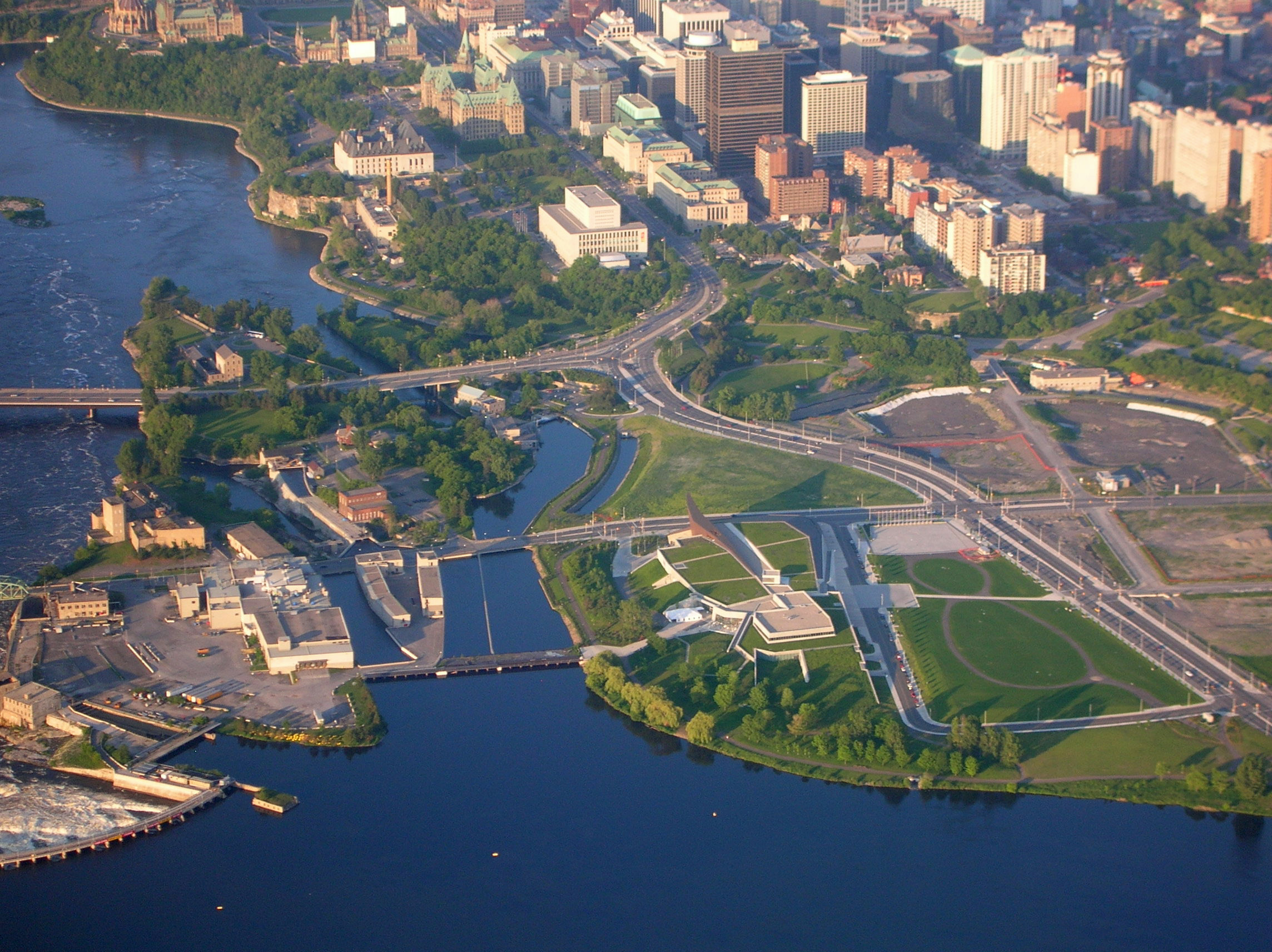
View of LeBreton Flats

The site which was selected for the buildings is located at 665 Albert Street on a 1.1 hectare site, referred to the Library Parcel, within LeBreton Flats. The buildings will be neighboring the new Ottawa Public Library Ādisōke. The light rail train station, Pimisi, is located next to the site providing direct transportation to or from the residences. The Ottawa River, Chaudière Falls, and the Canadian War Museum are located within the vicinity of LeBreton Flats. The site holds specific history including the Ottawa River timber trade and fur trade.

The project proposes four principal landscape designs consist of:

- Intersection to multi-use pathways
- Sustainability
- Civic responsibility
- The balancing of public interest.

== Dream LeBreton and sustainable building ==
The 31 and 36 story buildings will hold 601 housing units. There will be commercial and community spaces located on the bottom six story's of the buildings. There will be 600 indoor spaces for bike parking, and 201 parking spaces for residents located underneath the building. Margaret Priest, a Canadian artist, collaborated with the architects to design the building's facades. The choice of red materiality was selected in correlation with the neighboring communities. The materials that will be used for the buildings are regionally sourced, as well as natural and non-toxic. Of the 601 units, 132 of the units have been purchased by Multifaith Housing Initiative, in which they will operate them. The affordable housing units will be offered to those who apply for low as half the normal rent. The affordable housing, provided by Dream Impact Trust, is guaranteed to continue in the building for 55 years. If successful the buildings are targeted to be Canada’s largest residential zero carbon development. The buildings are to include wastewater energy systems, as well as a solar power-generating system. Through these initiatives the project is set to achieve net-zero carbon, LEED GOLD status, and One Planet Living accreditation. The project will provide affordable units to those in need, specifically providing priority to women, children, indigenous peoples, veterans, immigrants, and folks with disabilities. As of 2024, construction of the two buildings had yet to commence, but site preparation was in progress.
