= Intergovernmental Committee on Urban and Regional Research =

The Canadian Intergovernmental Committee on Urban and Regional Research (ICURR), located in Toronto, Ontario was established in 1968 following a Federal-Provincial Conference on Housing and Urban Development for the purpose of exchanging information between policy-makers on urban, rural and regional matters between provincial governments across Canada and at all levels of government. Not all provinces and territories were initially contributing members. In the late 1970s ICURR was formally established through an Order of Council with Ontario and Memorandums of Agreement between ICURR and the participating provinces and territories.

Presently, ICURR is funded by all Canadian provinces and territories, but it was formerly supported at the federal level as well by the Canada Mortgage and Housing Corporation (CMHC).

The Committee provides support to Canadian local and regional governments through its Muniscope service. Current services include a lending library, focusing on local, regional and municipal government, governance, planning (urban, rural, environmental and regional), and housing, primarily in Canada, and research services for funding partners and subscribers.

In the past, ICURR independently produced and published research reports as well as collaborated on research reports with the Institute of Public Administrators of Canada (IPAC), the Federation of Canadian Municipalities (FCM) and the Canada Mortgage and Housing Corporation (CMHC).

ICURR also facilitates the planning and document management for the annual Meeting of Provincial and Territorial Ministers Responsible for Local Government in Canada.

As of April 1, 2011, the Canada Mortgage and Housing Corporation (CMHC) withdrew the federal government's share of the funding of ICURR. The provincial and territorial ministries responsible for local government continue to fund the organization; however, the mandate for ICURR changed. The organization merged with the Caucus of Senior Policy Officials to form the Provincial-Territorial Officials Committee on Local Government.
