= Rainwater harvesting in Canada =

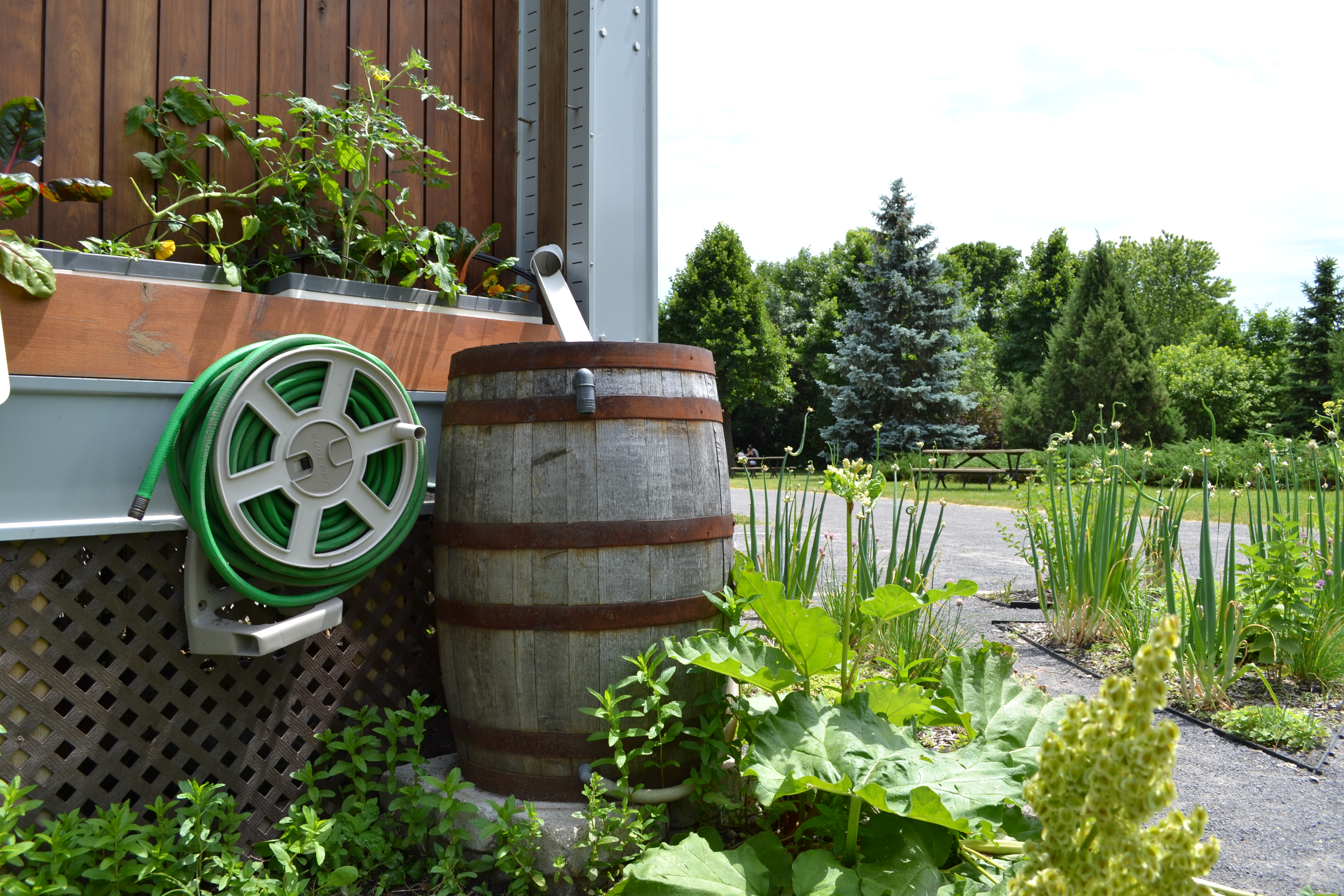
A small rainwater harvesting tank in Quebec.

Rainwater harvesting is becoming a procedure that many Canadians are incorporating into their daily lives, although data does not give exact figures for implementation. Rainwater can be used for a number of purposes including stormwater reduction, irrigation, laundry and portable toilets. In addition to low costs, rainwater harvesting is useful for landscape irrigation. Many Canadians have started implementing rainwater harvesting systems for use in stormwater reduction, irrigation, laundry, and lavatory plumbing. Provincial and municipal legislation is in place for regulating the rights and uses for captured rainwater. Substantial reform to Canadian law since the mid-2000s has increased the use of this technology in agricultural, industrial, and residential use, but ambiguity remains amongst legislation in many provinces. Bylaws and local municipal codes often regulate rainwater harvesting.

Multiple organizations and companies have developed in Canada to provide education, technology, and installation for rainwater harvesting. These include the Canadian Association for Rainwater Management (CANARM), Canadian Mortgage and Housing Corporation (CMHC), and CleanFlo Water Technologies. CANARM is an association that prioritizes education, training and spreading awareness for those entering the rainwater harvesting industry.

== Property rights ==
The National Plumbing Code permits the collection of rainwater for non-potable uses such as toilet flushing and outdoor irrigation throughout Canada. The right to harvest and use rainwater is determined by the provincial government and municipal bylaws. However, a majority of the provinces lack any significant legislation. The law of capture is not well defined and it varies for residential and non-domestic uses. When building a rainwater storage system, it is required that the design follows closely to the provincial codes and municipal bylaws. Multiple publications and reports have been developed by the Canadian Mortgage and Housing Corporation (CMHC) in order to aid Canadians in designing and installing rainwater capture systems that comply with these codes, regulations and bylaws.

=== Provincial property rights ===
Many provinces have outlined little to no provincial property rights pertaining to rainwater. Listed below are the provinces with some provincial legislation. However, many local municipalities have bylaws outlining criteria for capture and storage containers among other articles related to rainwater harvesting.

==== Alberta ====
Alberta has a set of Rainwater Harvesting Guidelines for residential use. They are recommended for the safe design, construction and maintenance of residential rainwater harvesting systems. The guidelines provide additional detail than what is present in the current code and supports conformance to CAN/CSA 128.1 Design and Installation of Non-Potable Water Systems/Maintenance and Field Testing of Non-Potable Water Systems. The Alberta Building Code and the National Plumbing Code requirements have precedence over these guidelines. In addition to the guidelines, a handbook was developed to provide broader understanding of the technical components of the guidelines.

==== British Columbia ====
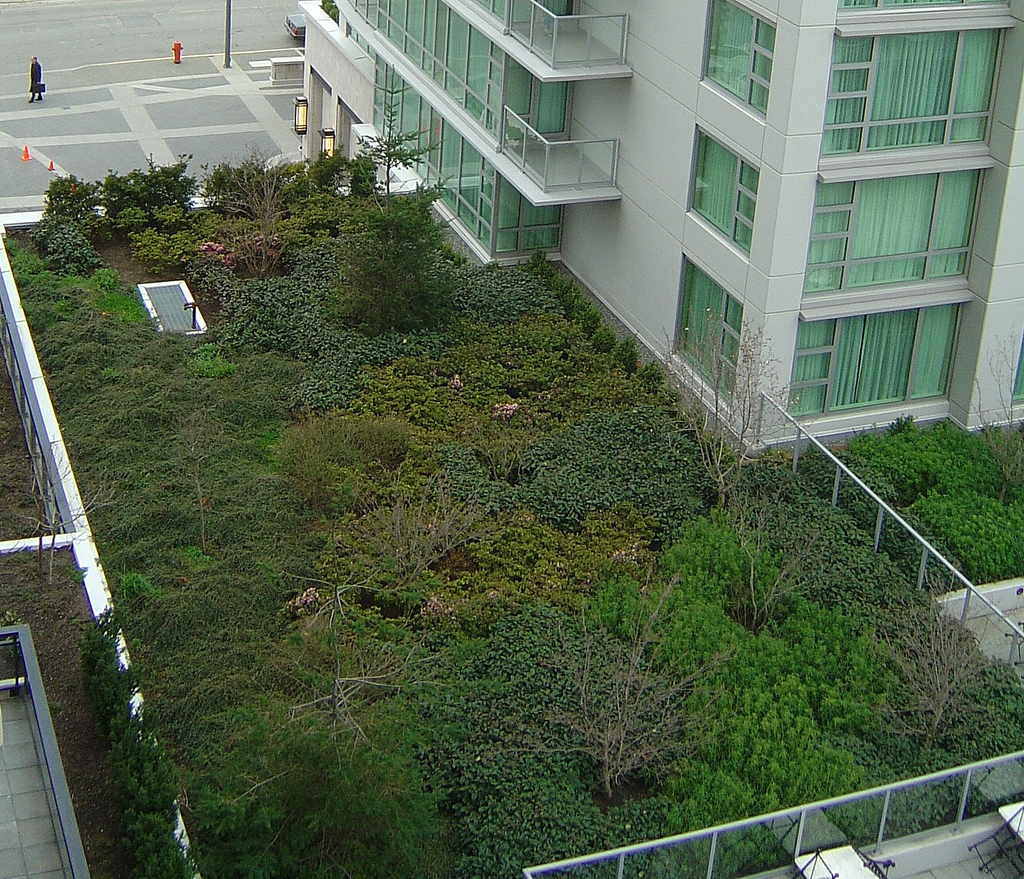
The Victoria BC Marriott green roof.

Rainwater in British Columbia appears to be common property subject to the law of capture. Effectively, rainwater belongs to no one and everyone until it is captured. While landowners do not have a property interest in water until it is captured, their right to harvest rainwater is unrestricted and not subject to concerns of downstream water users. Rainwater is not included in the Water Act's system of prior allocation. The likely common law position does not recognize correlative rights of other users to share equitably in the common resource of rainwater.

==== Ontario ====
In Ontario, the province permits the use of rainwater for flushing toilets and urinals, as well as for sub-surface and below ground irrigation systems. A large number of standards and regulations have been put in place regarding catchments, conveyance networks, and storage containers in Ontario Guidelines for Residential Rainwater Harvesting Systems. Since the temperature during winter months in Ontario drops below zero, rainwater is at a high risk of freezing. Therefore, the province of Ontario places a strong significance on guidelines to ensure that rainwater is in a controlled temperature environment. In addition, to avoid freezing in the pipe network, the water must be properly controlled via draining and temperature controls. Various systems and scenarios have been outlined regarding overflow management, pressurization, and back-flow prevention.

== Applications of rainwater harvesting in Canada ==
=== Agriculture ===
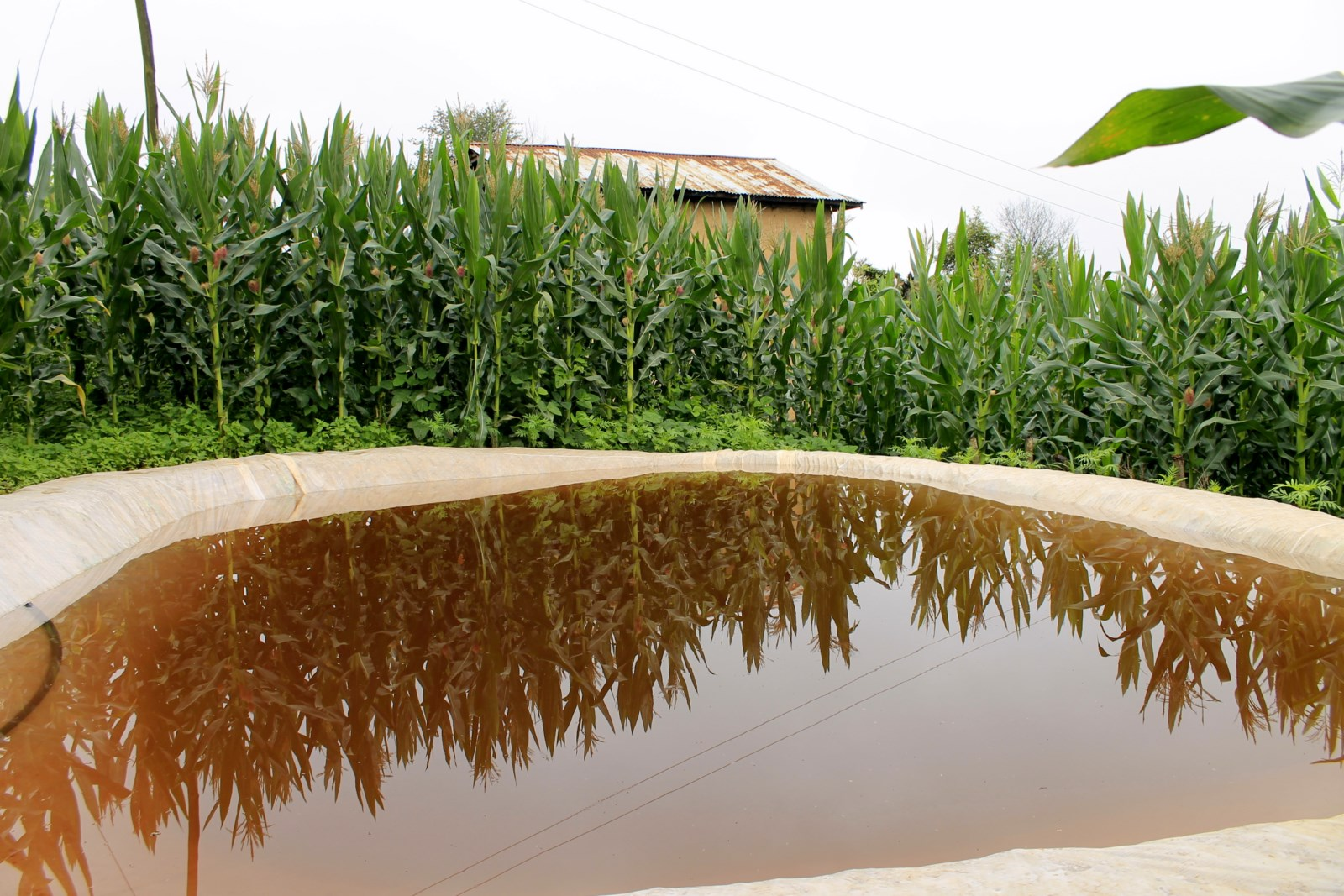
A rainwater harvesting pool for irrigation and water for livestock.

In Canada, rainwater harvesting used as a means of irrigation is not popular among farmers. Because of a rise in ecofarming, many farmers have implemented these systems. The uses for the rainwater harvested for agriculture includes irrigation and water for livestock. Often the water collected is redirected to a deep pit with percolation.

=== Leadership in Energy and Environmental Design (LEED) ===
Leadership in Energy and Environmental Design (LEED) is a rating system that is recognized as the international mark of excellence for green building in 150 countries. This includes Canada as recognized by the Canada Green Building Council. They give points for obtaining certifications to buildings with rainwater harvesting technologies implemented. These credits include the following: Stormwater quantity and quality controls to reduce runoff, increase reuse, and stop pollutants; efficient landscaping for rainwater reuse; innovative wastewater technologies for non-potable applications such as toilet flushing and process water; water efficiency to reduce the burden on municipal water supply and wastewater systems; and recycled content for use in rainwater harvesting materials.

=== Industry ===
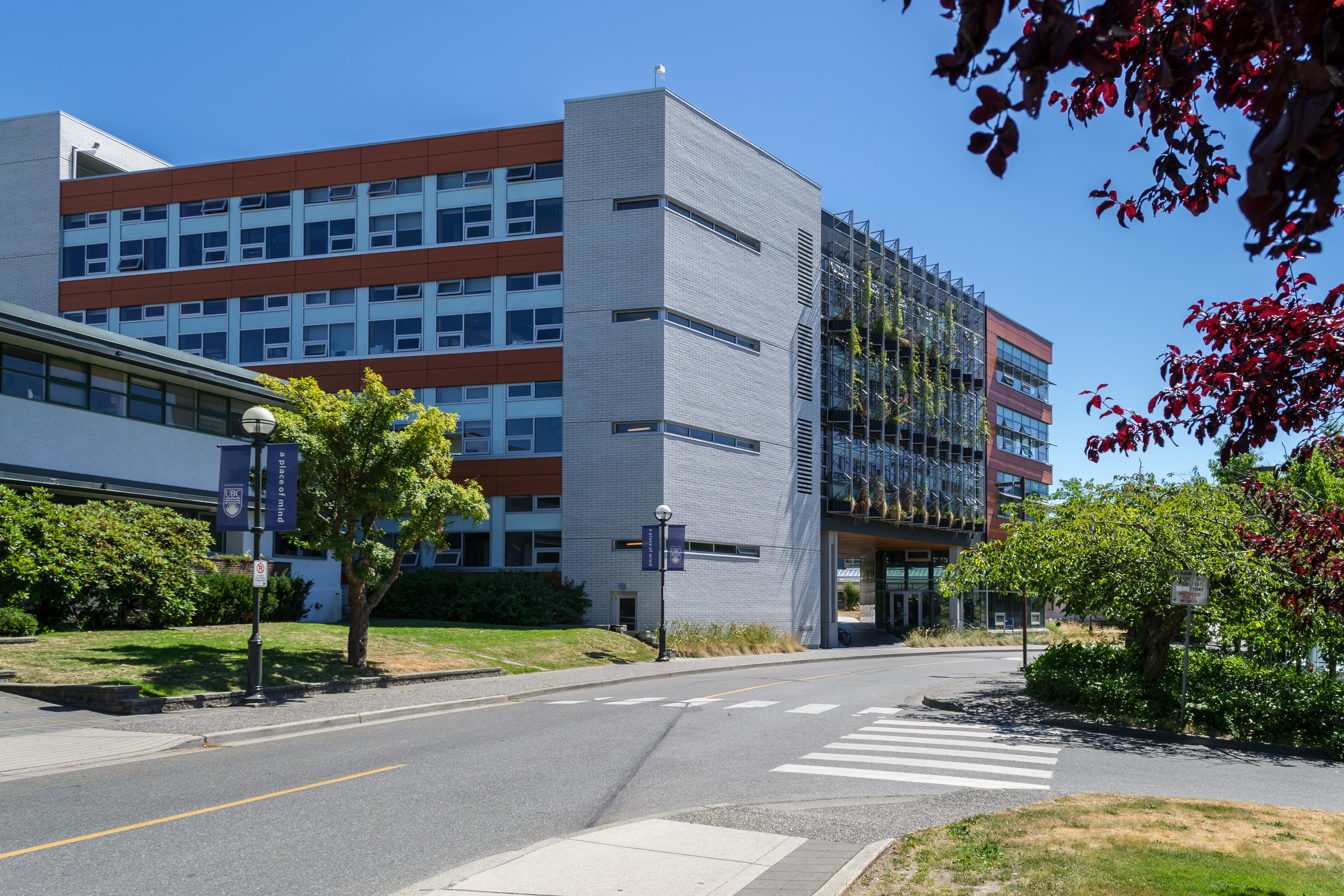
The Centre for Interactive Research on Sustainability uses rainwater capture methods, which helped it to become the first LEED Platinum building at the University of British Columbia.

Similar to agriculture, rainwater harvesting in Canada for industrial purposes is not widely used. If rainwater is utilized for industrial or commercial uses, a large cistern is generally implemented. These cisterns can hold up to 40,000 litres of water. In the Greater Toronto Area where the temperature in the winter months reaches well below freezing, cisterns are placed in temperature controlled areas such as an underground parking lot or a basement. The Centre for Interactive Research on Sustainability at the University of British Columbia (UBC) makes use of various rainwater capture methods for plumbing, heating and cooling. Data is not available on the number of buildings or businesses implementing rainwater harvesting.

=== Residential ===
Rainwater harvesting for residential use can be achieved easily by placing a tank underneath a downspout outside the home. There is also use in green roofs for irrigating plants naturally, providing a cooling system, and regulating condensation. In Canada, the regulations and legislation are still being developed for rainwater harvesting and greywater reuse (water used for laundry, showers and sinks).

== Potential impacts and benefits ==
The main source of water in the region is from mountain runoff, such as the Okanagan Mountain.

=== Impacts ===
In areas where water is scarce, rainwater harvesting can reduce the consumption of groundwater and in turn can be used to recharge the groundwater. In the summer months of Canada, the practice can decrease the pressure on municipal systems and is therefore seen as a great "green" alternative for water supply.

In Canada, rainwater harvesting has the potential to impact environmental flows and downstream water users. The hydrological cycle contains surface water, groundwater and rainwater. The effects on the hydrological cycle would be significant if rainwater became an advantageous solution to water quality and availability. However, the effects this practice has on a watershed is still unknown and further research must be conducted.

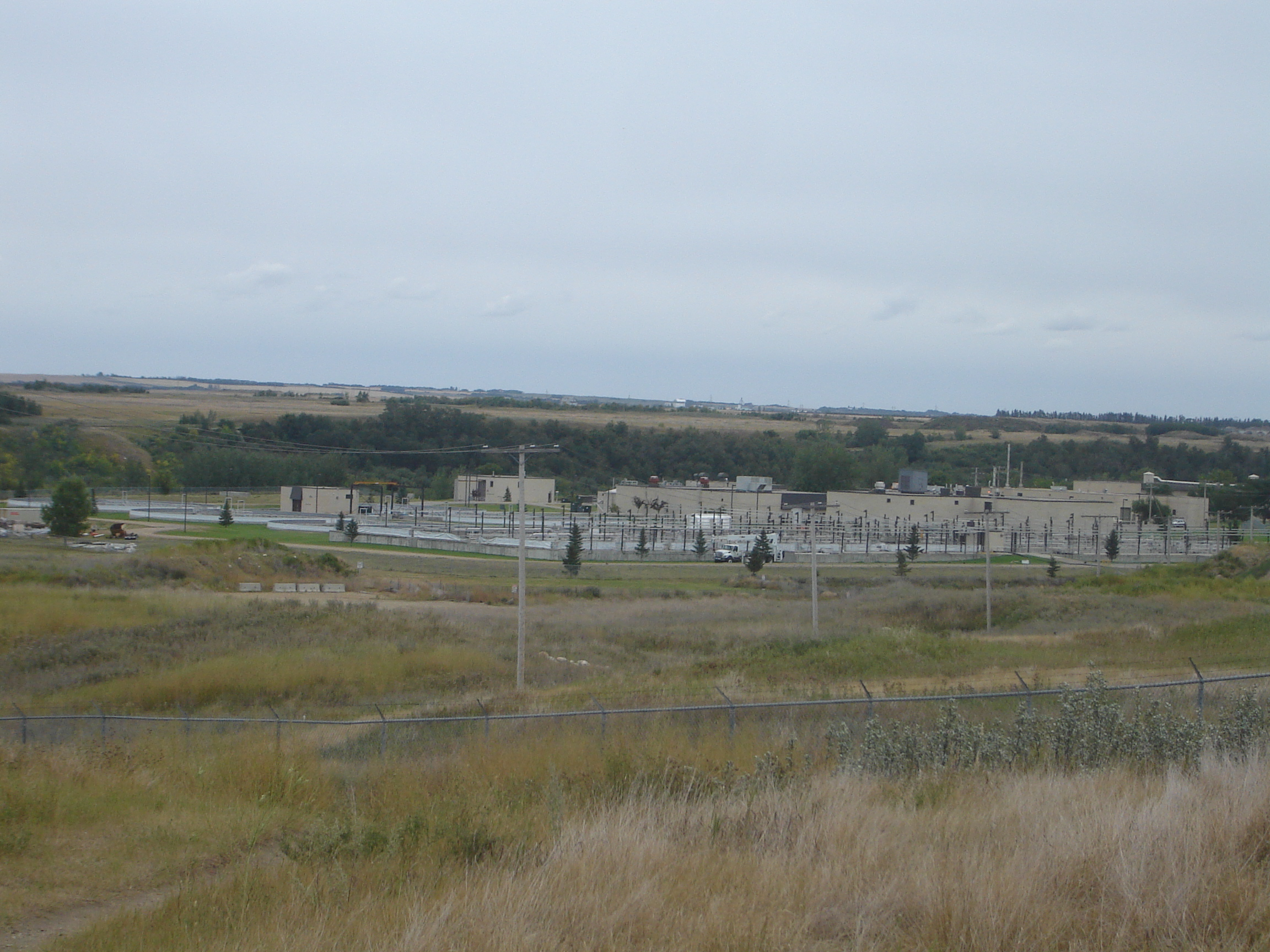
Saskatoon's wastewater treatment plant.

While the majority of the country has not yet faced water scarcity issues, it is believed that the potential for this to happen will increase because of climate change. However, one example of these issues is the Okanagan region in British Columbia. Currently, 89.5% of the surface water being used as a source is constrained because of licensing restrictions. Because of low volumes of rainfall throughout the year, an increase in rainwater harvesting could cause less water to be available to license holders that are downstream.

=== Benefits ===
Rainwater harvesting can limit the disruption of natural hydrology by reducing impervious cover, increasing on-site infiltration, reducing or eliminating pollution from stormwater runoff and eliminating contaminants. Furthermore, it can reduce the use of potable water or other natural surface/subsurface water resources available near sites for landscape irrigation. Rainwater harvesting also results in a reduction of wastewater generation and potable water demand. In addition, it reduces the burden on municipal water supply and wastewater systems.

== See also ==
- Water Conservation
- Stormwater
- Irrigation
- Provincial Government
- Clean Water Protection Act
- Centre for Interactive Research on Sustainability
- Canada Mortgage and Housing Corporation
