= Habitations Jeanne-Mance =

- Neighbourhood
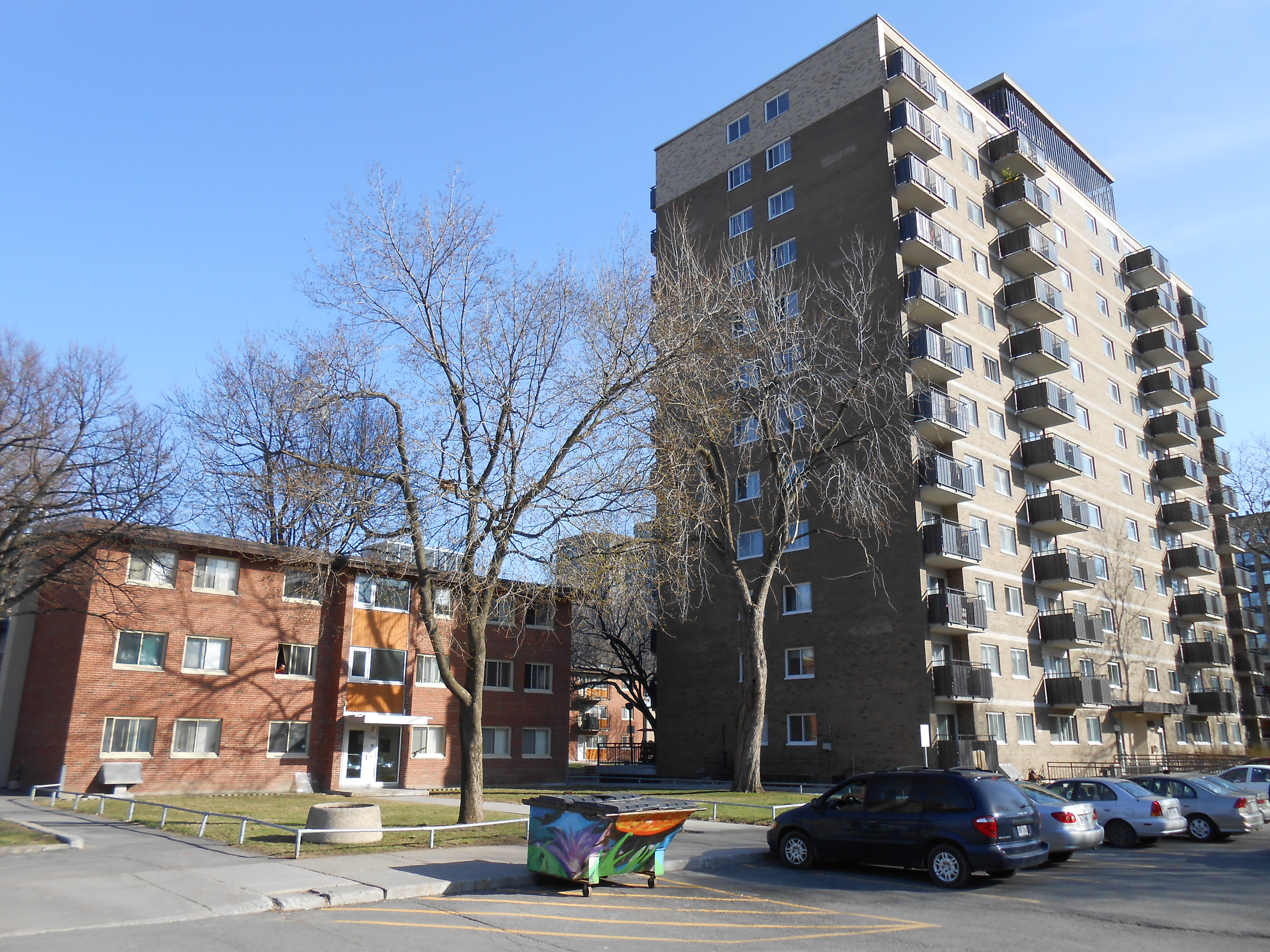

- Location of Habitations Jeanne-Mance in Montreal
- Coordinates: 45.512001°N 73.564221°W
- Country: Canada
- Province: Quebec
- City: Montreal
- Borough: Ville-Marie
- Inaugurated: October 15, 1959

Area
  - Land: 0.077 km^{2} (0.030 sq mi)

Population
  - Total: 1,700
  - Density: 22,077.9/km^{2} (57,181/sq mi)

Habitations Jeanne-Mance is a low-income project in Montreal, Quebec, Canada. It is located in the borough of Ville-Marie and is bordered by Ontario Street to the north, De Boisbriand Street to the south, Saint Dominique Street to the west and Sanguinet Street to the east. Built after the passage of the National Housing Act of 1954, Habitations Jeanne-Mance was the first public housing project built in Quebec and second housing project in Canada after Regent Park in Toronto. With the demolition of Regent Park in 2005, Habitations Jeanne-Mance is now the oldest postwar public housing project in Canada.

The complex occupies an area of 7.7 hectares (19 acres), and counts 788 housing units. There are five high-rise buildings for senior citizens, fourteen 3-storey multiplexes for families, and nine townhouses for families. Rents are calculated to be approximately 25% of the household's income. The complex is home to over 1,700 residents representing seventy countries. The average household income is C$56,000 per year.

In the 1960s, 1970s and 1980s, the complex had active tenants' committees that organized against evictions, for fairer treatment from management, and for increased tenants' rights city-wide.

== See also ==
- List of public housing projects in Canada
