= List of public housing projects in Canada =

== Canadian public housing projects ==
=== Alberta ===
- Edmonton
  - Ekota 1 projects
  - Ekota Manor
  - Duggan projects (Near Southgate Mall)
  - Menisa 1 projects
  - Satoo 1 projects

=== British Columbia ===
- Vancouver
  - Woodward's building
  - Stamps Place (RayCam Projects)
  - MacLean Park
  - Skeena Terrace
  - Little Mountain (33rd Projects)
  - Orchard Park (Nanaimo Projects)
  - The Tyee Article Stop Gap Housing in Vancouver

=== Manitoba ===
- Winnipeg
  - Lord Selkirk Park
  - Gilbert Park

=== Nova Scotia ===
In more recent decades Metro Housing has built smaller developments integrated into existing neighbourhoods. These are individually not notable enough to be included in this list.

- Halifax
  - Ahern Manor
  - Alderney Manor
  - Bayers-Westwood (Romans/Federal Ave)
  - Creighton/Gerrish/Göttingen Streets (various)
  - Gordon B. Isnor Manor (senior citizens)
  - Greystone Housing Complex (Spryfield)
  - H. P. MacKeen Manor
  - Joseph Howe Manor
  - Mulgrave Park
  - Nova Court
  - North Dartmouth (various)
  - Sir John Thompson Manor
  - Sunrise Manor (senior citizens)
  - The Hydrostone (originally administered by the Halifax Relief Commission, now privately owned)
  - Uniacke Square

=== Newfoundland and Labrador ===
- Corner Brook
  - Dunfield Park
- St. John's
  - Buckmaster's Circle

=== Ontario ===
- Brantford
  - Eastdale Gardens
  - Cedarview Apartments
  - Brier Park Houses
  - Parkview Heights
  - North Park Towers
  - Lynden Towers
  - Tollgate Houses
  - Applegate Complex
  - Northland Gardens
  - Riverside Gardens
  - Westglen Gardens
  - Cooper Towers
  - Brant Manor Apartments
  - Dornia Manor Apartments
  - Holmedale Apartments
  - Hazelview Projects
  - Centennial Towers
  - Dorchester Apartments
  - City Centre Apartments
  - Daleview Gardens
  - Lynnwood Projects
  - Chatham Apartments
  - Darling Apartments
  - 372 Darling Street
  - Winston Court
  - Sherwood Apartments
  - Winniett Apartments
  - John Noble Apartments
  - Slovak Apartments
  - Munro Houses
  - Northview Projects
  - Alfred Heights
  - Colborne Street Apartments
  - Village Tower
  - Brierwood gardens
  - Silver Pines
  - Counsel Park Apartments
  - West Gate Apartments
  - Y Apartments
  - Dalhousie Apartments
  - Phoenix Apartments
  - Heritage House
  - Albion Towers
  - Hayhurst Projects
  - Newport Apartments
- Burlington
  - The Manor
  - Bonnie Place II
- Hamilton
  - Barlake Buildings
  - Oriole Crescent
  - Jamesville Houses
  - John Street Buildings
  - Kenora Townhouses
  - Lang Street Houses
  - Lake Ave Houses
  - Congress Apartments
  - Ferguson Buildings
  - Sanford Ave. Building
  - 500 MacNab
  - 170 Jackson
  - Picton Street Houses
  - Guise Street co-op Apartments
  - Grandville Buildings
  - Queens
  - Quigley Buildings
- Kingston
  - Rideau Heights
  - Compton Street
  - 1130 Montreal Street
  - 300/312 Conacher Drive
  - 381/205 Bagot Street
  - 375 Patrick Street
  - 37 Cassidy
  - 234-266 Guthrie Drive
  - 257 Rideau Street
  - 37/41 Joseph Street
  - 700/710 Division Street
  - Barbara Avenue
  - 416 Elliot Avenue
  - 645 Brock Street
  - 111-129 Van Order Drive
  - Cliff Crescent
  - Curtis Crescent
  - 55 Notch Hill Road
  - 1338 Princess Street
  - Canatara Court
- London
  - Boulee Street, George Nace Gardens
  - Pond Mills Road, Allen Rush Gardens
  - 580 Dundas Street
  - Kipps Lane
  - Marconi
  - Limberlost
  - Southdale
  - 241 Simcoe Street
  - Huron Street
- Ottawa
  - Gloucester Non-Profit Housing
    - 1087 Cummings Avenue (Gloucester)
    - Emily Murphy Non-Profit Housing Cooperation (Blackburn Hamlet)
  - Multifaith Housing Initiative
    - Blake House
    - Somerset Gardens
    - Kent House
  - Ottawa Community Housing
    - Albion - Heatherington (Heron Gate)
    - Albion Gardens (Heron Gate)
    - Ashgrove (Huntclub/Uplands)
    - Banff/Ledbury (Heron Gate)
    - Bathgate Court (Carson's Grove)
    - Beausoleil Drive (Lowertown)
    - Belisle (Vanier)
    - Bellevue Manor (Caldwell)
    - Britannia Woods (Ritchie)
    - Bronson Terrace (Centertown)
    - Brooke Towers (Centertown)
    - 181 Bruyere (Lowertown)
    - Cairine Court (Overbrook)
    - 1500 Caldwell (Caldwell)
    - Carson's road (Carson's Grove)
    - Clementine Towers (Billings Bridge)
    - Confederation Court (Russell Road)
    - Carson-Paul (Carson's Grove)
    - Charlotte Place (Lowertown)
    - Debra-Dynes Family House (West Ottawa)
    - 251 Donald (Overbrook)
    - 255 Donald (Overbrook)
    - Dubeau Court (Overbrook)
    - Fairlea Court (Heron Gate)
    - Foster Farm (Ramsey Crescent)
    - 200 Friel (Lowertown)
    - 261 Garneau (Vanier)
    - Golden Manor (Westboro)
    - Green Valley Terrace (Vanier)
    - Hampton Court (Hampton Park)
    - Heather Manor (Heron Gate)
    - Hooper (Carlington)
    - 303 King Edward (Lowertown)
    - Lady Stanley Place (Lowertown)
    - MacDonald Manor (Lowertown)
    - MacLaren Towers (Centertown)
    - 1433 Mayview (Carlington)
    - Michele Heights (Penny Drive)
    - Montfort/Fatima Place (Vanier)
    - Morrison Gardens (Draper Avenue)
    - 380 Murray (Lowertown)
    - Nepean place (Centertown)
    - Pathway Private (Draper Avenue)
    - 1030 Du Pere Charlebois (Vanier)
    - Pinecrest Terrace (Iris Street)
    - Queen Mary Court (Overbrook)
    - 1065 Ramsey Crescent
    - Regina Towers (Lincoln Heights)
    - Rochester Towers (Centertown)
    - Rosenthal (Carlington)
    - Russell Gardens (Russell Road)
    - Russell Heights (Russell Road)
    - Russell Manor (Russell Road)
    - 500 Saint Laurent Boulevard (Ottawa East)
    - 800 Saint Laurent Boulevard (Ottawa East)
    - 2178 Saint Laurent Boulevard (Herongate)
    - Shearwater Court (Hunt Club)
    - 1180 Shillington Avenue (Carlington)
    - 214 Somerset (Centertown)
    - Somerset Towers (Centertown)
    - Tapiola Court (Hunt Club)
    - Thomson Terrace (Vanier)
    - 674 Tweedsmuir (Hampton Park)
    - White Fathers (Vanier)
    - Winthrop Court (Lincoln Heights)
    - 215 Wurtemburg (Lowertown)
- St. Catharines
  - Manchester Apartments
  - Rykert Street Apartments
  - Northtown Courts
  - Roehampton Place
  - Watermark Co-op Homes
  - People's Choice Cooperative Homes
  - Pinecroft Cooperative Homes Apartments
  - Greenvale Cooperative Homes
- Toronto
  - Regent Park (currently being revitalized)
  - Lawrence Heights (planned revitalization)
  - 607-615 The East Mall
  - 516-552 The West Mall
  - Dundas/Mabelle
  - 44 Willowridge Road
  - 2063/2067 Islington Avenue
  - 42-44, 50 Dixington Crescent
  - Ardwick Boulevard
  - 206-216 Duncanwoods Drive
  - San Pietro Way
  - 1570 Jane Street
  - 710/720 Trethewey Drive
  - 30 Denarda Street
  - 4020 Dundas Street West
  - 3725/3735 Dundas Street West
  - Swansea Mews
  - 136-152 Perth Avenue
  - 11 Randolph Avenue
  - 55 Rankin Crescent
  - Pelham Park Gardens
  - 101-121 Humber Boulevard
  - 2468 Eglinton Avenue West
  - 1884 Davenport Road
  - 2 Antler Street
  - 177 Pendrith Street
  - Melita Crescent
  - 1400 Bathurst Street
  - Cabbagetown (various)
  - Bleecker Street
  - Lumsden Avenue
  - Scarlettwood Court
  - St. James Town
  - Flemingdon Park
  - Crescent Town
  - Parkdale (various)
  - Jane and Finch (various, including Driftwood Avenue, Shoreham Drive, 15 Tobermory Drive, 20 Yellowstone Street, Jane/Firgrove, Grandravine Drive, 1862-1901 Sheppard Avenue West)
  - Kingston-Galloway (part of West Hill)
  - Eglinton East (400/410 McCowan road)
  - The Esplanade
  - Rexdale (various, including Jamestown, Mount Olive, Tandridge Crescent)
  - Malvern (various, including Empringham)
  - 30-40 Teesdale Place
  - Cataraqui-Firvalley Court
  - Roywoods Drive
  - Bay Mills Boulevard
  - 360 Pitfield Road
  - Greenbrae Circuit
  - Orton Park
  - 2/15 Canlish Road
  - 1021 Birchmount Road
  - 20-30 Eppleworth Road
  - 3190 Kingston Road
  - 3171/3181 Eglinton Avenue East
  - 140 Adanac Drive
  - 400/410 McCowan Road
  - Gilder Drive
  - Allenbury Gardens
  - Bishop Tutu Boulevard
  - Moss Park
  - Mornelle Court (part of Morningside)
  - Chester Le (part of L'Amoreaux)
  - Glendower Circuit (part of L'Amoreaux)
  - Falstaff
  - Thorncliffe Park
  - Willowtree (part of Willowdale)
  - Danzig (part of West Hill)
  - Weston (various)
  - Alexandra Park
  - Blake-Jones
  - Don Mount Court (revitalized)
  - Parma Court
  - Gordonridge Place
  - 190 Woolner Avenue
- York Region
- Housing York Corporation
  - Aurora, Ontario
    - Hadley Grange - seniors
    - Charles Darrow Co-operative Housing
    - Orchard Heights Place - seniors
    - Machell's Corners Co-operative
    - Orchard Heights Place - seniors
  - King, Ontario
    - Kitchen Breedon Manor
    - Kingview Court, Housing York Inc.
    - Nobleview Pines, Housing York Inc.
  - Richmond Hill, Ontario
    - 76 Dunlop Pines
    - Centre Green Co-operative Housing
    - 78 Dunlop Pines
    - Evergreen Terrace
    - Genesis Place
    - John Fitzpatrick Steelworkers Housing Co-operative
    - Ja'Fari Islamic Housing Jubilee Gardens
    - Mackenzie Green
    - Landsberg/Lewis Co-operative Housing
    - Maplewood Place
    - Oakwill Non-Profit Homes Corporation
    - Observatory Towers Richmond Hill Co-operative Homes
    - Rose Town
    - Springbrook Gardens
    - St. Matthew's Non-Profit Homes
  - East Gwillimbury, Ontario
    - Oxford Village
  - Georgina, Ontario
    - Future Building
    - Keswick Gardens
    - Glenwood Mews
    - Our Lady of Smolensk Bethany Co-operative Housing
    - Rixon Manor
    - East Court
    - Pineview Terrace
    - Northview Court
  - Newmarket, Ontario
    - Armitage Gardens
    - Alison Court
    - Cedarview Lodge Bogart Creek Co-operative Housing
    - German-Canadian Housing of Newmarket Inc.
    - Brayfield Manors
    - Heritage East
  - Carpenters Local 27 Housing Co-operative Inc.
    - Fairy Lake Gardens
    - Founders Place
    - Manor Green
    - Tom Taylor Place
    - Mulock Village
    - Trinity Glen
  - Whitchurch-Stouffville, Ontario
    - Parkview Village
    - Elmwood Gardens
  - Vaughan, Ontario
    - Blue Willow Terrace
    - OHR Somayach Residential Centre
    - Friuli Benevolent Corporation
    - Woodbridge Lane
    - Legion Wood Apartments
    - Mapleglen Residences
    - Maple Manor
    - OHR Somayach Residential Centre
    - St. Peters Senior's Residences
  - Markham, Ontario
    - Annswell Court
    - Calvary Manor
    - Hagerman Corners Community Homes
    - Cedar Crest Manor
    - Kinsmen Non-Profit Corp.
    - Robinson Street Non-Profit Homes
    - Heritage Village
    - Trinity Square
    - St. Luke's Lodge
    - Thornhill Green
    - Thomson Court Apartments Singles

=== Quebec ===
- Montreal
  - Habitations Jeanne-Mance
  - Habitation Richmond
  - Habitation Notre-Dame-de-Grâce
  - Habitation St-Raymond
  - Habitations Sherbrooke Forest
  - Habitations Benny
  - Plan Robert
  - Plan Bellechasse
  - Parc Painter
  - Habitations Des Oblats
  - Habitations Parc Royal
  - Habitations Tolhurst
  - Village Cloverdale
