= Subsidized housing =

Government or non-profit housing (actual buildings or rental assistance)

Subsidized housing is a subsidy aimed towards alleviating housing costs and expenses for impoverished people with low to moderate incomes. In the United States, subsidized housing is often called "affordable housing". Forms of subsidies include direct housing subsidies, non-profit housing, public housing, rent supplements/vouchers, and some forms of co-operative and private sector housing. Increasing access to housing usually contributes to lower poverty rates.

== Types ==
Housing subsidies are government funded financial assistance programs designed to mitigate the costs of housing for low-income tenants. Subsidies can be provided in the form of housing vouchers given to tenants, e.g. Section 8 (Housing), or via direct deposits to landlords with government contracts to provide affordable housing.

=== Home mortgage interest deduction ===
The largest housing subsidy in the US is the home mortgage interest deduction, which allows homeowners with mortgages on first homes, second homes, and even boats with bathrooms to lower their taxes owed. The cost to the federal government of the mortgage interest deductions in 2018 was approximately $25 billion, down from $60 billion for 2017 as a result of the Tax Cuts and Jobs Act of 2017. Some states also have the mortgage interest deduction provision. The majority of the home mortgage interest deduction goes to the top 5% income earners in the United States.

The home mortgage interest deduction in the United States increases home prices, decreases homeownership, decreases economic welfare, and has regressive distributive effects.

=== Rent subsidies ===
Some housing subsidies are provided to low income tenants in renting housing. These include shelter allowances, housing supplements, and shelter supplements from regional and local governments designed to help low-income households that spend a large proportion of their income on rent, such as New York City's Family Eviction Prevention Supplement program. The subsidies are often defined by whether the subsidy is given to the landlord and then criteria are set for the tenants they can lease to or whether the subsidy is given to the tenant, typically as a voucher, and they are allowed to find suitable private housing. The subsidy amount is typically based on the tenant's income, usually the difference between the rent and 30% of the tenant's gross income, but other formulas have been used.

According to a 2018 study, major cuts in rental subsidies for poor households in the United Kingdom led to lowered house prices.

In rare cases a financial institution or non-profit organization will provide mortgage loans at rates that are not profitable for the sake of a specific group. In Canada one such organization is Non-Profit Housing Subsidies Canada which provides subsidized mortgage loans to employees and volunteers of other non-profit organizations.

Rent supplements are subsidies paid by the government to private landlords who accept low-income tenants. The supplements make up the difference between rental "market price" and the amount of rent paid by tenants, for example 30% of the tenants income. A notable example of a rent supplement in the United States is Section 8 of the Housing Act of 1937 (42 U.S.C. § 1437f).

Some housing cooperatives are subsidized housing because they receive government funding to support a rent-geared-to-income program for low-income residents. In addition to providing affordable housing, some co-ops serve the needs of specific communities, including seniors, artists, and persons with disabilities.

== See also ==
- Subsidized housing in the United States
- Public housing
- Affordable housing
- Housing estate
- Section 8 (USA)
- National Housing Act (Canada)
- HLM (France)
- Million Programme (Sweden)
- Plattenbau (Germany)
- Panelház (Hungary)
- Panelák and Sídlisko (Czech Republic and Slovakia)
- Khrushchyovka (Former Soviet Union)
- Migration of the disadvantaged
- Social welfare
- Welfare state
