= Rural housing =

Provision of housing in rural areas is considered a social crisis in the United States. The rural housing crisis may seem insignificant at first glance, but upon deeper digging, one will find that the issue is actually affecting millions living in rural areas. The rural housing crisis, or insecurity, manifests in multiple ways, including increased costs, the rural income not keeping up with the increased costs, substandard housing, overcrowding, and environmental crises, all of which affect rural populations tremendously.

== Rural housing in the United Kingdom ==
The lack of affordable housing is one of the most critical issues facing rural communities in the UK. This results in people have to move away to find affordable housing, which means that families are separated by distance and are less able to support each other by providing childcare or to do shopping for elderly relatives. Moreover, local services such as schools and shops become increasingly difficult to maintain due to lack of demand, while rural enterprises cannot recruit sufficient workers who live locally. An integrated approach is needed to sustain rural communities.

== Rural housing in the United States ==
Introduction

To look first at the statistics, in terms of increased costs, it was found that 42% of all rural renters are cost-burdened, meaning they pay more than 30% of their income for housing, and that 21% of all rural renters pay more than 50% of their income for housing (Johnston 2018). In terms of the income not keeping up, it was reported by the White House’s Council of Economic Advisors that rent increased by 31.2% from 2000 to 2023 in rural areas, but the median real income of rural renting households only increased by 5.5%2 (The White House 2025). In terms of substandard housing, indoor plumbing was found to be unavailable to 4% of all rural housing. In terms of overcrowding, of the 4% that lack indoor plumbing, 10% have more than one occupant per room (Johnstone 2018). Finally, in terms of the environmental crises, researchers are seeing clear links between natural disasters (such as wildfires, tornados, and hurricanes across the United States, which are being exacerbated by global warming and rising sea levels) and affordable housing for rural communities (Antin 2024) (U.S. Climate Resilience Toolkit 2020). Housing has also been recognized as a strong social determinant of health, so having a crisis presents a real issue to the development of children in rural areas and the progression of healthy adults (Tickamyer 2017).

Experts and Their Studies

Experts are also actively conducting research on this crisis. In California, researchers from the Center for Critical Public Health, Institute for Scientific Analysis, studied the rural housing insecurity specifically in California’s rural northern counties and reported their findings (Antin 2024).

Their sample size was 210 interviewees with participants aged between 18 and 35 years old. Their findings show how unaffordability takes root in rural areas predominantly, the effect of the unaffordability of housing, the effect of natural disasters on community members, in this case, wildfires, and how the housing crisis is affecting the health of rural community members, statistically compared to urban populations. In the area specifically, it is mentioned that “the supply of affordable housing has shrunk, renters’ incomes have stagnated, and federal spending for housing assistance has remained inadequate”. This area used to be a logging and mining area, but as time progressed, and the basis of the economy needed to shift, not all were able to easily progress. Due to this, the wages in the area also don’t give enough to allow most of the rural population to put down a down payment for a home. A property manager from the rural community is quoted as saying, “There are a lot more people looking for housing than there are available housing units”.

Financial capital also plays a large role in being able to obtain a house. Many residents struggle with credit scores and are denied or put on year-long holds. The other issue is that tourism is attracting the urban population to visit, which has homeowners putting up their homes for Airbnb and making it unaffordable for rural renters to actually rent in the community. Specific to the region, the wildfires have an effect on housing and on health. In terms of housing, wildfires create instability in residents' homes, and this can be induced by other circumstances such as getting behind on rent, eviction, foreclosure, etc. Finally, there comes the matter of conditions in a home, such as access to clean water in showers or tap water. Many wells dried up in the area, which forces residents to get bottled water delivered, which not only costs money to buy the water but also to go get the water uses up gas, and the gas prices have gone up. In some homes, there is access, but the water is dirty and causes a risk of health-related issues down the line. This is just one example of a suffering rural community in the United States, and many more exist, especially in the Deep South.

Current Work and Policy Making

In the United States, the federal government engaged with rural housing for the first time during the Great Depression (Johnston 2018). The program was known as the Federal Emergency Relief Administration. A housing act was enacted following World War II, which authorized the Farmers Home Administration (FmHA) to make loans and grants to farmers, and this act was expanded with the Rural Development Act to include all rural residents, not just farmers.

However, in 1994, the department was reorganized and divided into the Farm Service Agency and the Rural Development. Rural Development is crucial to providing rural communities with loans and grants to support housing, healthcare, water, wastewater systems, electronic and broadband infrastructure, and economic development. For low- and very-low-income households, there is a program that provides direct loans with low interest rates as well. Attached to this program, there is a self-help housing technical assistance program that enables these low- and very low-income households to participate in the construction of their own homes, which reduces cost and teaches them construction skills. Over 50,000 families have taken part in this program. In 2017, however, this self-help program was cut from the budget.

Though the American Housing Survey (AHS) "Homeownership rates increased for virtually all racial and ethnic groups, income groups, regions, and rural and urban areas during the 1990s." However, according to the US Housing Market Conditions, 2nd quarter, 2007 report by the United States Department of Housing and Urban Development, "Housing affordability worsened as sales prices of existing homes increased and mortgage interest rates increased. Housing market performance was weak in the second quarter of 2007, with generally falling production levels and weak existing home sales. The exceptions are the increase in new home sales and the slight increase in housing starts. Inventories of new and existing homes available for sale continue at very high levels, with enough houses available to last nearly 8 months. The home ownership rate declined to 68.2 percent in the second quarter of 2007."

Programs that are addressing the needs of rural housing can be seen through the United States Department of Agriculture’s Rural Housing Service. Other assistance is available through the Housing Assistance Council which is a non-profit organisation. In the United States, "the Housing Assistance Council (HAC) has been helping local organizations build affordable homes in rural America since 1971. HAC emphasizes local solutions, empowerment of the poor, reduced dependence, and self-help strategies. HAC assists in the development of both single- and multi-family homes and promotes home-ownership for working low-income rural families through a self-help, "sweat equity" construction method. The Housing Assistance Council offers services to public, non-profit, and private organisations throughout the rural United States. HAC also maintains a special focus on high-need groups and regions: Indian country, the Mississippi Delta, farmworkers, the Southwest border colonias, and Appalachia.”

The United States Department of Agriculture researches and compiles data sources for rural areas of the United States, through the Economic Research Service, as seen in their article, "One in Four Nonmetro Households are Housing Stressed,” where it indicates that, "Of the Nation’s 2,000-plus nonmetropolitan (nonmetro) counties, 302 are defined as housing stressed." It also states, "The principal component of housing stress is high housing expenses relative to income...” The United States Department of Agriculture, National Agricultural Library’s, Rural Information Center’s Housing page also provides additional resources for rural housing within the United States and works with rural communities and citizens to assist them in housing information needs.

== Rural housing in India ==
In India, rural housing is provided through Indira Awaas Yojana, a welfare program of the Government of India. It was first implemented in 1985 and in the 2011 budget the program was funded in the amount of ₹89.96 billion (US$930 million).

== See also ==
- Affordable housing
- American Housing Survey
- Rural community development
- Rural Housing Service
