= 2019 Canadian federal budget =

2019 Budget of the Canadian Federal Government
- Presented: 19 March 2019
- Country: Canada
- Parliament: 42nd
- Party: Liberal
- Finance minister: Bill Morneau
- Total revenue: $338.8 billion (Projected); 334.1 billion (Actual)
- Total expenditures: $355.6 billion (Projected); 373.5 billion (Actual)
- Deficit: $19.8 billion (Projected); 39.4 billion (Actual)
- GDP: 2,337,684
- Website: https://budget.canada.ca/2019/docs/plan/budget-2019-en.pdf

The Canadian federal budget for fiscal year 2019–20 was presented to the House of Commons by Finance Minister Bill Morneau on March 19, 2019. This was the last budget before the 2019 federal election. The deficit is projected to rise to $19.8 billion, after including a $3 billion adjustment for risk. The budget introduced $22.8 billion of new spending over six years. The budget will not make any changes to the income tax brackets for individuals or corporations. This was later refined to $39.4 billion when the Annual Financial Report of the Government of Canada for Fiscal Year 2019–2020 was released. This budget would be the final federal budget presented by Bill Morneau before his resignation as finance minister amid the WE Charity scandal.

The projected deficit of $19.8 billion would result in a deficit of ca. 0.9% of GDP. At the same time the GDP grew by 1.6% in 2019.

== New Expenditures ==
This budget aims to reduce interest rates on postsecondary students' Canada Student Loans and will eliminate interest charges on student debt during the six-month grace period that begins upon graduation.

The budget will appropriate an additional $586.5-million a year to pay for job training through the Employment Insurance program.
