= Centre for Interactive Research on Sustainability =

Centre for Interactive Research on Sustainability (CIRS)
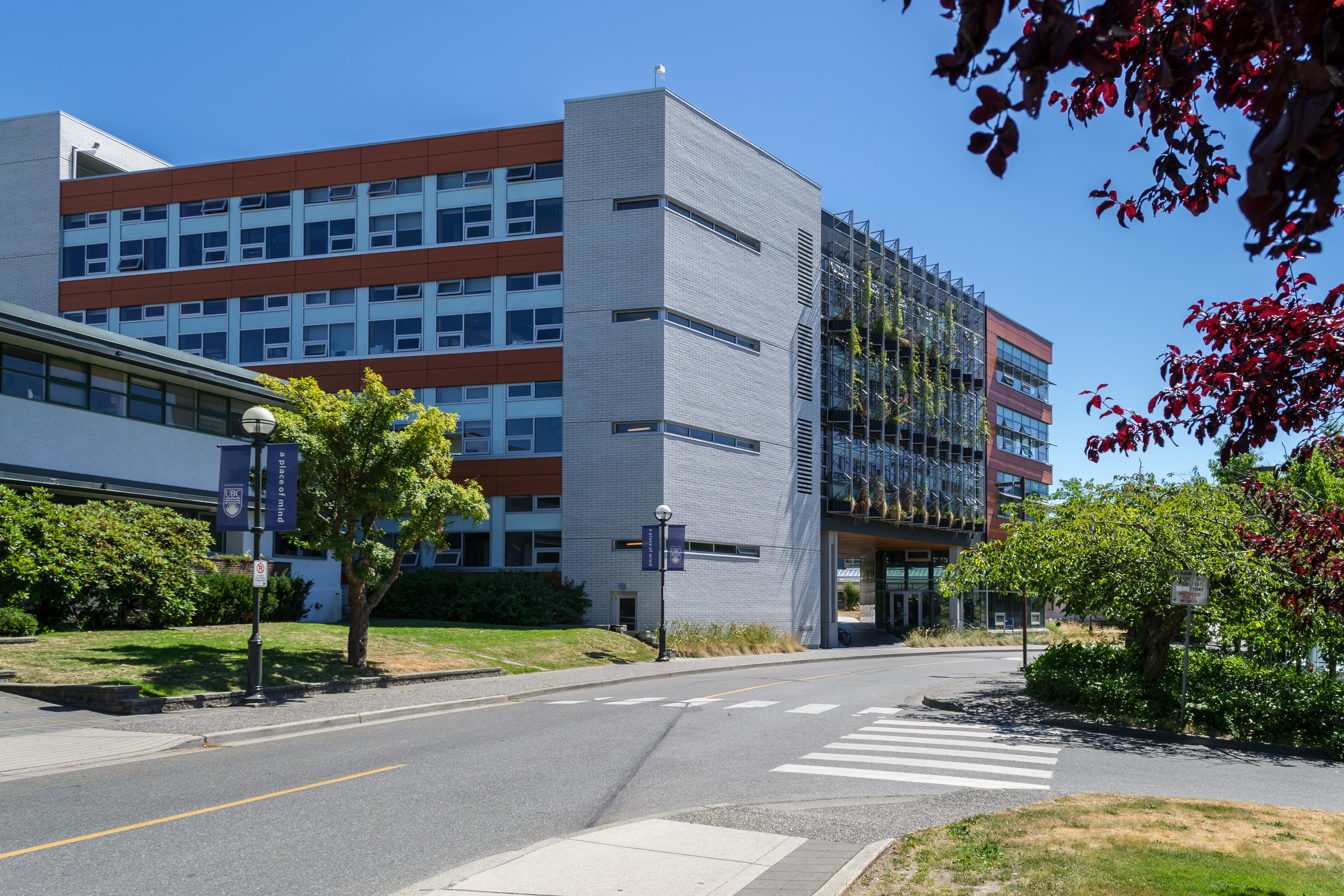
- The CIRS building

- Location within Canada

General information
- Type: Offices, Lecture Hall
- Location: 2260 West Mall, Vancouver, British Columbia, Canada, Canada
- Coordinates: 49°15′43.1″N 123°15′11.68″W
- Construction started: 2009
- Completed: August 2011
- Cost: CA$37 million
- Owner: University of British Columbia

Technical details
- Floor count: 4

Design and construction
- Architect: Peter Busby of Perkins and Will
- Developer: (Conceived by John Robinson)
- Structural engineer: Fast + Epp

Website
- cirs.ubc.ca

The Centre for Interactive Research on Sustainability (CIRS) is located at the University of British Columbia's (UBC) Point Grey Campus in Vancouver. The building is dedicated to research collaboration and outreach on urban sustainability. It was officially opened in November 2011.

Some key features:

- 600 tons of carbon dioxide sequestered in the structure
- Campus energy consumption reduced by 275 megawatt-hours per year
- Water 100% supplied by rainwater
- Campus carbon dioxide emissions reduced by 150 tons each year

It has been certified LEED Platinum by the Canada Green Building Council.

== Mission ==
- Develop applied technical solutions in building materials and design for commercialization by partners.
- Combine expert knowledge and public values and preferences in exploring pathways to a sustainable society.
- Collaborate with private, public and non-governmental organization sector partners to create superior policy and business decisions for sustainable urban development.
- Educate, train and demonstrate sustainable technologies and services and the practices of sustainable urban development.

== Goals ==
- Be a world leader in three critical areas of sustainability research: technology, communication, participation and behaviour change, and policy and investment.
- Make real progress on sustainability in the region and transform the UBC campus into a testing ground for alternative energy sources, and technologies.
- Be an incubator for sustainability technologies and capitalize on the enormous export potential to enter the trillion-dollar global urban infrastructure market.

== History ==
The CIRC was conceived in 2000 by Professor John Robinson and designed by Peter Busby who excelled in green building designs. Together, they organized and talked to potential partners which led to Alberto Cayuela, formally an employee of Stantec and now associate director responsible for CIRS, joining the team as program manager.

Once funding and concept was decided, the location was chosen. Originally, it was to be built on the UBC Point Grey campus, but, because CIRS was an inter-instituational project (UBC leads the project in conjunction with Simon Fraser University, BC Institute of Technology, and Emily Carr University of Art + Design) it was felt that the Great Northern Way campus would be a better position. In line with the idea of an inter-institutional project, the new position would expand its scope and breadth.

In 2008, the decision to move CIRS back to UBC Point Grey campus was made due to delays to the project timeline brought on by the complexity of building on the Great Northern Campus. Although, now only one institution (UBC) owned CIRS, other institutions continued to participate through other means.

Construction began in 2009 with excavation and foundation work for the first six months with the building being complete in August 2011.

== Building benefits ==
=== Structural systems ===
The CIRS is constructed of wood and allows for various benefits such as reducing ecological impact, sequestering carbon, helping the mitigation of an ecological problem, bringing warmth to the building interiors, and also maximizing daylight and views.

=== Building materials ===
The primary exterior material is white brick, clear glazing, wood, and neutral colored concrete. The benefits are the reduction of 'red list' materials, improvement of indoor air quality, reduction of material waste, and reduction of carbon emissions.

=== Energy systems ===
The CIRS achieves a net-positive energy performance and reduces UBC's overall energy consumption by over 1 million kilowatt hours per year. The energy system benefits the project by providing a comparison between energy modelling processes, allows for more opportunities for research and system testing, inspire a new approach to energy supply/consumption, reduce heat demand and carbon emissions of neighboring buildings, and provide opportunities for continued learning.

=== Rainwater system ===
CIRS is entirely water self-sufficient by harvesting rainwater and stored in a 100-cubic-meter cistern underneath the building. Around 1,226,000 litres of rainwater is harvested throughout the year, and average demand is 2000 litres per day. The benefits of a rainwater potable water system is that it creates awareness, educates the public on water supply/consumption, reduces potable water demand, promotes stormwater management, and provides an onsite water source for fire suppression.

=== Reclaimed water ===
All the reclaimed water originates either from the CIRS building or sewer system which is treated onsite using a Solar Aquatics wastewater treatment system and reused in the building for toilet flushing and to irrigate the living roof, landscaped areas and the living wall. The main benefit of this treatment system is awareness and engaging the public in viewing sustainability as a possibility.

=== Lighting ===
Narrow floor plates allowed for daylight penetration and light to enter the building from both sides. The benefits is that it improves the inhabitant health and comfort, creates a friendly space, reduces energy consumption and cost, and provides a surface for photovoltaic cells.

=== Ventilation ===
The CIRS uses a mixed mode system utilizing mostly passive natural ventilation. There are two mechanical air handling units that supply fresh filtered air: one to the large auditorium and the other to the rest of the building. In addition, there are manual operable windows that allows for airflow and temperature control. This system reduces energy consumption, connects the inhabitants with nature, and improve their health.

== Public recognition ==
The CIRS has been publicly recognized by many as "North America's Greenest Building" and one of the greenest buildings in the world. Most recently in 2013, the CIRS won the Green Building Award awarded by the Wood WORKS! BC Wood Design Awards.

== See also ==
- Rainwater harvesting in Canada
