= Multifaith Housing Initiative =

Charitable organisation in Ottawa, Canada

Multifaith Housing Initiative (MHI) is a charitable organization based in Ottawa, Canada. MHI's mission is to provide and promote affordable housing, to encourage harmonious relations amongst tenants of diverse backgrounds, and to mobilize the resources of faith communities and others for these purposes. This membership-based organization represents a working model of interfaith peace and collaboration at the local level in the effort to fight homelessness. MHI's goal is to provide secure and affordable housing because through this individuals as well as the community benefit from improved health outcomes, educational achievement, social inclusion, and economic opportunities.

== Organization ==
MHI is a grassroots coalition of many different faith communities. Suzanne Le has been the Executive Director since January 2013 when she took over from Sue Evans who served as Executive Director from 2008 to December 2012. The organization is composed of the Board of Directors, the executive committee, 8 working committees, the tenants, and over 100 volunteers. External to the organization are the member faith communities (who pay a membership and hold voting rights) and religious patrons and donors. In 2016 the membership consisted of over 75 individual congregations from nearly every faith in the Ottawa region.

The idea for MHI was born in 2000 with the intention of supporting individual local congregations' efforts to develop their land for affordable housing in the Ottawa region. In 2004 it re-incorporated itself when the charity's purposes shifted from supporting churches and faith groups develop their land to receiving support from the churches and faith groups while MHI purchased and developed land. In 2005 it received its first interest-free loan and used it towards the purchase of a five-unit apartment building, its first property acquisition. By 2014 MHI had a total of three properties: 10 condominium units in Somerset Gardens and 27 units at Blake House in Vanier. That same year, MHI was awarded the 2014 Action Ottawa Affordable Housing Request for Proposal (RFP) that has given way to the construction of the Haven in Barrhaven.

The organization received the CMHC Housing Award in 2008. It has received financial support from the Canada – Ontario Affordable Housing Program. the Ontario government, the City of Ottawa, and from the federal Investment Affordable Housing Program.

== Housing ==
Currently MHI owns and operates 179 rental units at 5 locations: 26 units at Blake House, 10 units at Somerset Gardens, 5 units at Kent House, and 98 units at the Haven, as well as 40 units at Veterans' House: the Andy Carswell Building for veterans who were formerly homeless/at risk of homelessness.

=== The Haven ===
In 2014 the City of Ottawa made reducing homelessness an urgent priority and has selected MHI as one of its key partners. The Haven will be a family-oriented mixed income 98-unit project consisting of townhouses and low-rise apartment buildings for rent in the Barrhaven community. Construction began in October 2015 and will be completed in Spring 2017. The units of varying size are expected to provide housing to roughly 300 people. This project has received support from donors including $200,000 from the Ottawa branch of the King's Daughters and Sons and $200,000 from an anonymous donor through the Community Foundation. The 75 member churches have, as of October 2016, cumulatively raised over $500,000.

=== Veterans' House: the Andy Carswell Building ===
Veterans' House is a “Housing First” supportive housing model, the first for MHI. It helps veterans in need to gain stable housing and offer support to recover from health, mental health, or addiction-related issues. In addition to improving veterans' quality of life, family members who are unable to provide care will know their loved ones are living in a supportive and affordable environment rather than living on the streets. The house is located at the old Rockcliffe Airbase and will provide 40 single units to Canadian veterans in need. The project began the design phase in 2014 and opened in early 2021. MHI’s partners for this project include True Patriot Love, Ottawa Salus, Soldiers Helping Soldiers, Canadian Forces Morale and Welfare Services, Centretown Affordable Housing Development Corporation, the Royal Canadian Legion, and Support Our Troops.

== Events ==
Since 2007 MHI has held an annual fundraising "Tulipathon" walkathon event in May. The event consists of a walk from Dow's Lake to Bank Street and a family-friendly celebration at Commissioners Park. There is a banner competition between the congregations, for which the Mayor Jim Watson has been the judge in previous years.

The National Housing Day event is held annually in November and is open to the public. The event includes an interfaith celebration and a reception to raise awareness and funds for ongoing housing projects.
