= Jiggetts (New York legal case) =

The Jiggetts case established New York City's Jiggetts housing assistance program, which was ultimately replaced by the Family Eviction Prevention Supplement in 2005.

The procedures in the case went under the titles Jiggetts v. Grinker and Jiggetts v. Dowling.

== Jiggetts v. Grinker (1988) ==
The case started as a class action brought in the New York State courts by recipients of Aid to Families with Dependent Children(AFDC).

Plaintiffs filed an action challenging the adequacy of the shelter allowance schedule for families with children in New York City. They argued that they were entitled to grant levels adequate to pay the rents actually charged and that the New York State Department of Social Services had violated this entitlement by failing to increase the shelter allowance to keep pace with shelter costs. They asserted their claims under § 350(1)(a) of the New York Social Services Law and Article XVII of the New York State Constitution.

Defendants filed a motion to dismiss, the trial court denied that motion, and the defendants appealed to the New York Court of Appeals.

== Jiggetts v. Grinker (1990) ==
In the landmark decision Jiggetts v. Grinker, 75 N.Y.2d 411, 554 N.Y.S.2d 92 (1990), the New York Court of Appeals held that the public assistance "shelter allowance" for families with minor children in New York City must bear reasonable relation to the actual cost of housing.

== Jiggetts v. Dowling (1997) ==
The case was remanded for a trial on the adequacy of the shelter grant. While the case was pending, an administrative procedure was implemented pursuant to Jiggetts that allows AFDC recipients to receive shelter costs in excess of the shelter grant.

After a lengthy trial, the New York State Supreme Court determined, in a decision dated April 16, 1997 that the shelter allowances did not bear a reasonable relationship to the cost of housing in New York City. The court ordered the Commissioner of the New York State Department of Social Services to promulgate a reasonable shelter allowance schedule. The court's final judgment required the State to operate an interim relief system because of the inadequacy of the shelter allowance "until such time as a lawful shelter allowance is implemented."

The New York Appellate Division affirmed the judgment in all respects.

== See also ==
- Family Eviction Prevention Supplement
