= Family Eviction Prevention Supplement =

The Family Eviction Prevention Supplement was created by the New York City Human Resources Administration in May 2005 as a program to help prevent evictions of families on welfare shelter. It provides additional housing assistance to Cash Assistance (CA) eligible families with children, above and beyond the CA shelter amount.

FEPS can last for up to five years (with an extension for good cause), as long as the household maintains CA and FEPS eligibility. Applicants/participants with a court proceeding concerning the nonpayment of rent can apply for FEPS through a New York State Office of Temporary and Disability Assistance (OTDA) authorized community-based organization (CBO), the Legal Aid Society or a Legal Services preparer, thereby avoiding homelessness.

== Replaces Jiggetts ==
It replaces the Jiggetts housing assistance program that arose under the Jiggetts lawsuits. Families receiving Jiggetts continued to receive that support until 2007.

== Eligibility ==
Candidates must:

- have an eviction case in court.
- be a tenant with one year lease, or Rent Stabilized or Rent Controlled.
- have an active welfare case, and no one can be sanctioned.
- have children under 18 living with you.

== Payment schedule ==
FEPS pays arrears up to $7000 and monthly rent payments for up to five years.

The maximum rent that FEPS will pay to a household is as follows:

FEPS Maximum Payment Schedule
Household Size	Maximum Rent	Maximum Supplement
1	$1,213	$936
2	$1,268	$985
3	$1,515	$1,515
4	$1,515	$1,065
5	$1,956	$1,455
6	$1,956	$1,432
7	$2,197	$1,651
8	$2,197	$1,651
9	$2,530	
10	$2,530	

== Changes to sanction rules ==
Under the old rules, if one member of the household was sanctioned, the entire household lost its FEPS benefits for the period of the sanction.

Under the new rules, the family will be able to get the money for the unsanctioned family members to help with rent arrears if the family is facing eviction because of the sanction.

== Other details ==
- Individuals residing in the household that are not receiving Public Assistance (e.g. SSI recipients) must pay 30% of their income toward the rent.
- FEPS does not accept rent payments from third parties.
- FEPS applications can be filed through specific legal providers and community-based organizations in each borough.
- The tenants must pay the amount over what FEPS is paying using their cash assistance, child support, work income, or from a third party.
- If the tenant has to leave the apartment because of a court or agency vacate order (e.g., if a city agency like the Department of Buildings ordered the building to be emptied because of structural problems), the tenant can qualify for FEPS for the new apartment.
