= National Housing Act (Canada) =

Acts of Parliament of Canada

National Housing Act 1954

Parliament of Canada
- Citation: 1985, c. N-11
- Enacted: 1954
- Administered by: Canada Mortgage and Housing Corporation

Repeals
- National Housing Act 1944

Amended by
- 1956, 1964, 1969, 1973, 1985, 1999, 2007
- Status: Amended

The National Housing Act (French: Loi nationale sur l’habitation, NHA) is the primary federal law concerning housing in Canada. More specifically, it is intended to promote the construction of new houses, the repair and modernization of existing houses, and the improvement of housing and living conditions.

The NHA replaced and expanded the scope of the Dominion Housing Act of 1935. First passed by the Parliament of Canada in 1938, replacement National Housing Acts were passed in 1944 and 1954. Major amendments to these acts occurred in 1948, 1949, 1956, 1964, 1969, 1973, 1985, 1999 and 2007.

The purpose of the NHA set out in section 3 "in relation to financing for housing, is to promote housing affordability and choice, to facilitate access to, and competition and efficiency in the provision of, housing finance, to protect the availability of adequate funding for housing at low cost, and generally to contribute to the well-being of the housing sector in the national economy."

The Canada Mortgage and Housing Corporation is the agency responsible for administering the act, since its establishment in 1945.

== History ==
=== Dominion Housing Act 1935 ===
Dominion Housing Act

Parliament of Canada
- Enacted: 1935
- Royal assent: July 5, 1935

Legislative history
- Third reading: June 25, 1935
- Status: Amended

The Dominion Housing Act was passed in 1935 as Canada's first national housing policy.

It included as part of "Canada's New Deal" put forward by Prime Minister R. B. Bennett, who was facing an election with low support following his government's response to the Great Depression. Taking inspiration from President Roosevelt's New Deal, Bennett proposed regulatory and social safety net legislation.

Despite demands for affordable housing from social reformers, the DHA ended up setting the tone for all future housing legislation with the provision of loans for the wealthiest Canadians and promotion of homeownership and mortgage lending infrastructure.

The DHA consisted of two parts:

1. a proposal for the continued study of the housing problem by the (also proposed) Economic Council of Canada;
2. a plan for the federal state to combine with lenders in the provision of joint mortgage loans to buyers and builders of new homes.

The DHA provided $20 million in loans. A total of 3,263 mortgage loans were administered through the Dominion Housing Act from 1935 to 1938.

Two years after the DHA was passed, the Federal Home Improvement Plan was established and subsidized the interest rates on loans for housing rehabilitation to 66,900 homes.

=== National Housing Acts ===
National Housing Act 1944

Parliament of Canada
- Enacted: 1944
- Royal assent: August 15, 1944

Repeals
- National Housing Act 1938

Amended by
- 1948, 1949
- Status: Repealed

National Housing Act 1938

Parliament of Canada
- Enacted: 1938
- Royal assent: July 1, 1938
- Repealed: August 15, 1944

Repeals
- Dominion Housing Act 1935
- Status: Repealed

In 1938, the first National Housing Act was passed by the Parliament of Canada to replace and expand the scope of the Dominion Housing Act of 1935. Replacement National Housing Acts were later passed in 1944 and 1954. Major amendments to these acts occurred in 1948, 1949, 1956, 1964, 1969, 1973, 1985, 1999 and 2007.

Deputy Minister of Finance William Clifford Clark was the one to draft the National Housing Acts of 1938 and 1944, as well as the Dominion Housing Act.

In 1945, the Central Mortgage and Housing Corporation (later renamed Canada Mortgage and Housing Corporation) was created to administer the NHA.

Amendments to the Act in 1948 introduced limited-dividend housing. In 1949, the Act was again amended to provide joint federal-provincial funding to construct public, rent-geared-to-income housing; however, this was seen as a "tokenist" gesture and very few social housing units were built.

The NHA of 1954 was largely similar to its predecessors in its objective to "maintain the private mortgage market". It was significant in replacing the existing joint-loan program with a mortgage-loan one.

The 1964 amendments made provinces, municipalities or their agencies the sole owners of public housing, as previously public housing was jointly owned with CMHC.

The 1973 amendments provided financial assistance for new home buying, loans for co-operative housing, and low interest loans for municipal and private non-profit housing. As such, the federal approach was shifted to low-income housing from "social," segregated public housing to "comprehensive" housing policy and included provisions for non-profit and co-operative housing.
